

364001–364100 

|-bgcolor=#d6d6d6
| 364001 ||  || — || October 30, 2005 || Mount Lemmon || Mount Lemmon Survey || — || align=right | 4.0 km || 
|-id=002 bgcolor=#d6d6d6
| 364002 ||  || — || October 29, 2005 || Mount Lemmon || Mount Lemmon Survey || KOR || align=right | 1.4 km || 
|-id=003 bgcolor=#d6d6d6
| 364003 ||  || — || October 29, 2005 || Catalina || CSS || EOS || align=right | 2.1 km || 
|-id=004 bgcolor=#d6d6d6
| 364004 ||  || — || October 31, 2005 || Kitt Peak || Spacewatch || EOS || align=right | 2.4 km || 
|-id=005 bgcolor=#d6d6d6
| 364005 ||  || — || October 28, 2005 || Mount Lemmon || Mount Lemmon Survey || — || align=right | 2.6 km || 
|-id=006 bgcolor=#d6d6d6
| 364006 ||  || — || October 26, 2005 || Kitt Peak || Spacewatch || KOR || align=right | 1.6 km || 
|-id=007 bgcolor=#d6d6d6
| 364007 ||  || — || October 23, 2005 || Catalina || CSS || BRA || align=right | 2.4 km || 
|-id=008 bgcolor=#E9E9E9
| 364008 ||  || — || October 24, 2005 || Palomar || NEAT || — || align=right | 3.0 km || 
|-id=009 bgcolor=#E9E9E9
| 364009 ||  || — || October 26, 2005 || Socorro || LINEAR || INO || align=right | 1.6 km || 
|-id=010 bgcolor=#E9E9E9
| 364010 ||  || — || October 22, 2005 || Kitt Peak || Spacewatch || — || align=right | 2.4 km || 
|-id=011 bgcolor=#E9E9E9
| 364011 ||  || — || October 23, 2005 || Palomar || NEAT || — || align=right | 1.7 km || 
|-id=012 bgcolor=#d6d6d6
| 364012 ||  || — || October 25, 2005 || Apache Point || A. C. Becker || EOS || align=right | 1.9 km || 
|-id=013 bgcolor=#E9E9E9
| 364013 ||  || — || October 27, 2005 || Apache Point || A. C. Becker || AGN || align=right | 1.1 km || 
|-id=014 bgcolor=#d6d6d6
| 364014 ||  || — || October 25, 2005 || Mount Lemmon || Mount Lemmon Survey || EOS || align=right | 1.9 km || 
|-id=015 bgcolor=#E9E9E9
| 364015 ||  || — || November 3, 2005 || Socorro || LINEAR || BAR || align=right | 1.7 km || 
|-id=016 bgcolor=#d6d6d6
| 364016 ||  || — || October 25, 2005 || Mount Lemmon || Mount Lemmon Survey || EOS || align=right | 1.7 km || 
|-id=017 bgcolor=#E9E9E9
| 364017 ||  || — || November 2, 2005 || Socorro || LINEAR || — || align=right data-sort-value="0.93" | 930 m || 
|-id=018 bgcolor=#E9E9E9
| 364018 ||  || — || November 3, 2005 || Socorro || LINEAR || — || align=right | 2.4 km || 
|-id=019 bgcolor=#d6d6d6
| 364019 ||  || — || November 4, 2005 || Mount Lemmon || Mount Lemmon Survey || CHA || align=right | 1.7 km || 
|-id=020 bgcolor=#d6d6d6
| 364020 ||  || — || November 2, 2005 || Mount Lemmon || Mount Lemmon Survey || — || align=right | 2.8 km || 
|-id=021 bgcolor=#d6d6d6
| 364021 ||  || — || November 3, 2005 || Catalina || CSS || — || align=right | 3.0 km || 
|-id=022 bgcolor=#E9E9E9
| 364022 ||  || — || October 28, 2005 || Catalina || CSS || — || align=right | 2.4 km || 
|-id=023 bgcolor=#d6d6d6
| 364023 ||  || — || November 2, 2005 || Socorro || LINEAR || — || align=right | 4.6 km || 
|-id=024 bgcolor=#E9E9E9
| 364024 ||  || — || November 4, 2005 || Catalina || CSS || — || align=right | 1.8 km || 
|-id=025 bgcolor=#d6d6d6
| 364025 ||  || — || November 11, 2005 || Kitt Peak || Spacewatch || — || align=right | 4.2 km || 
|-id=026 bgcolor=#E9E9E9
| 364026 ||  || — || November 1, 2005 || Apache Point || A. C. Becker || — || align=right | 2.2 km || 
|-id=027 bgcolor=#d6d6d6
| 364027 ||  || — || November 1, 2005 || Apache Point || A. C. Becker || — || align=right | 2.6 km || 
|-id=028 bgcolor=#E9E9E9
| 364028 ||  || — || November 1, 2005 || Apache Point || A. C. Becker || — || align=right | 1.9 km || 
|-id=029 bgcolor=#d6d6d6
| 364029 ||  || — || November 1, 2005 || Apache Point || A. C. Becker || ALA || align=right | 4.2 km || 
|-id=030 bgcolor=#d6d6d6
| 364030 ||  || — || November 1, 2005 || Mount Lemmon || Mount Lemmon Survey || — || align=right | 2.1 km || 
|-id=031 bgcolor=#d6d6d6
| 364031 ||  || — || November 22, 2005 || Kitt Peak || Spacewatch || EMA || align=right | 2.8 km || 
|-id=032 bgcolor=#d6d6d6
| 364032 ||  || — || October 29, 2005 || Mount Lemmon || Mount Lemmon Survey || — || align=right | 3.7 km || 
|-id=033 bgcolor=#d6d6d6
| 364033 ||  || — || November 21, 2005 || Kitt Peak || Spacewatch || — || align=right | 3.2 km || 
|-id=034 bgcolor=#d6d6d6
| 364034 ||  || — || November 22, 2005 || Kitt Peak || Spacewatch || THB || align=right | 3.5 km || 
|-id=035 bgcolor=#d6d6d6
| 364035 ||  || — || November 25, 2005 || Mount Lemmon || Mount Lemmon Survey || HYG || align=right | 2.8 km || 
|-id=036 bgcolor=#d6d6d6
| 364036 ||  || — || November 22, 2005 || Kitt Peak || Spacewatch || TEL || align=right | 1.4 km || 
|-id=037 bgcolor=#E9E9E9
| 364037 ||  || — || November 25, 2005 || Kitt Peak || Spacewatch || — || align=right | 2.9 km || 
|-id=038 bgcolor=#d6d6d6
| 364038 ||  || — || November 25, 2005 || Kitt Peak || Spacewatch || — || align=right | 4.2 km || 
|-id=039 bgcolor=#d6d6d6
| 364039 ||  || — || November 26, 2005 || Mount Lemmon || Mount Lemmon Survey || KOR || align=right | 1.3 km || 
|-id=040 bgcolor=#E9E9E9
| 364040 ||  || — || November 22, 2005 || Kitt Peak || Spacewatch || — || align=right | 2.8 km || 
|-id=041 bgcolor=#d6d6d6
| 364041 ||  || — || November 22, 2005 || Kitt Peak || Spacewatch || VER || align=right | 3.2 km || 
|-id=042 bgcolor=#E9E9E9
| 364042 ||  || — || October 1, 2005 || Catalina || CSS || — || align=right | 2.5 km || 
|-id=043 bgcolor=#d6d6d6
| 364043 ||  || — || November 28, 2005 || Mount Lemmon || Mount Lemmon Survey || EOS || align=right | 1.7 km || 
|-id=044 bgcolor=#d6d6d6
| 364044 ||  || — || November 28, 2005 || Mount Lemmon || Mount Lemmon Survey || — || align=right | 3.7 km || 
|-id=045 bgcolor=#d6d6d6
| 364045 ||  || — || November 26, 2005 || Kitt Peak || Spacewatch || — || align=right | 2.8 km || 
|-id=046 bgcolor=#d6d6d6
| 364046 ||  || — || November 26, 2005 || Kitt Peak || Spacewatch || — || align=right | 2.8 km || 
|-id=047 bgcolor=#E9E9E9
| 364047 ||  || — || November 26, 2005 || Catalina || CSS || — || align=right | 3.2 km || 
|-id=048 bgcolor=#d6d6d6
| 364048 ||  || — || November 30, 2005 || Kitt Peak || Spacewatch || — || align=right | 2.9 km || 
|-id=049 bgcolor=#E9E9E9
| 364049 ||  || — || November 29, 2005 || Socorro || LINEAR || BAR || align=right | 1.5 km || 
|-id=050 bgcolor=#d6d6d6
| 364050 ||  || — || November 25, 2005 || Mount Lemmon || Mount Lemmon Survey || — || align=right | 2.8 km || 
|-id=051 bgcolor=#d6d6d6
| 364051 ||  || — || November 28, 2005 || Mount Lemmon || Mount Lemmon Survey || KAR || align=right | 1.1 km || 
|-id=052 bgcolor=#d6d6d6
| 364052 ||  || — || November 30, 2005 || Kitt Peak || Spacewatch || — || align=right | 4.0 km || 
|-id=053 bgcolor=#d6d6d6
| 364053 ||  || — || November 25, 2005 || Kitt Peak || Spacewatch || EOS || align=right | 2.0 km || 
|-id=054 bgcolor=#E9E9E9
| 364054 ||  || — || November 25, 2005 || Catalina || CSS || — || align=right | 1.8 km || 
|-id=055 bgcolor=#d6d6d6
| 364055 ||  || — || November 6, 2005 || Kitt Peak || Spacewatch || — || align=right | 4.0 km || 
|-id=056 bgcolor=#d6d6d6
| 364056 ||  || — || November 29, 2005 || Kitt Peak || Spacewatch || — || align=right | 3.9 km || 
|-id=057 bgcolor=#d6d6d6
| 364057 ||  || — || November 28, 2005 || Mount Lemmon || Mount Lemmon Survey || HYG || align=right | 2.9 km || 
|-id=058 bgcolor=#d6d6d6
| 364058 ||  || — || November 29, 2005 || Socorro || LINEAR || CHA || align=right | 2.7 km || 
|-id=059 bgcolor=#d6d6d6
| 364059 ||  || — || November 6, 2005 || Mount Lemmon || Mount Lemmon Survey || — || align=right | 2.9 km || 
|-id=060 bgcolor=#E9E9E9
| 364060 ||  || — || December 2, 2005 || Socorro || LINEAR || — || align=right | 2.8 km || 
|-id=061 bgcolor=#d6d6d6
| 364061 ||  || — || December 4, 2005 || Mount Lemmon || Mount Lemmon Survey || KOR || align=right | 1.4 km || 
|-id=062 bgcolor=#d6d6d6
| 364062 ||  || — || December 4, 2005 || Kitt Peak || Spacewatch || — || align=right | 3.8 km || 
|-id=063 bgcolor=#d6d6d6
| 364063 ||  || — || December 1, 2005 || Kitt Peak || Spacewatch || — || align=right | 2.7 km || 
|-id=064 bgcolor=#d6d6d6
| 364064 ||  || — || December 4, 2005 || Kitt Peak || Spacewatch || — || align=right | 3.6 km || 
|-id=065 bgcolor=#d6d6d6
| 364065 ||  || — || December 5, 2005 || Socorro || LINEAR || — || align=right | 1.8 km || 
|-id=066 bgcolor=#d6d6d6
| 364066 ||  || — || November 29, 2005 || Kitt Peak || Spacewatch || — || align=right | 2.6 km || 
|-id=067 bgcolor=#FA8072
| 364067 ||  || — || December 6, 2005 || Socorro || LINEAR || — || align=right | 1.7 km || 
|-id=068 bgcolor=#d6d6d6
| 364068 ||  || — || December 6, 2005 || Kitt Peak || Spacewatch || — || align=right | 3.2 km || 
|-id=069 bgcolor=#d6d6d6
| 364069 ||  || — || December 2, 2005 || Kitt Peak || Spacewatch || — || align=right | 2.9 km || 
|-id=070 bgcolor=#d6d6d6
| 364070 ||  || — || December 1, 2005 || Kitt Peak || M. W. Buie || THM || align=right | 1.7 km || 
|-id=071 bgcolor=#FA8072
| 364071 ||  || — || December 21, 2005 || Catalina || CSS || — || align=right | 3.1 km || 
|-id=072 bgcolor=#fefefe
| 364072 ||  || — || December 22, 2005 || Kitt Peak || Spacewatch || FLO || align=right data-sort-value="0.63" | 630 m || 
|-id=073 bgcolor=#d6d6d6
| 364073 ||  || — || December 24, 2005 || Kitt Peak || Spacewatch || — || align=right | 2.9 km || 
|-id=074 bgcolor=#fefefe
| 364074 ||  || — || December 24, 2005 || Kitt Peak || Spacewatch || — || align=right data-sort-value="0.95" | 950 m || 
|-id=075 bgcolor=#d6d6d6
| 364075 ||  || — || December 22, 2005 || Kitt Peak || Spacewatch || EOS || align=right | 2.5 km || 
|-id=076 bgcolor=#d6d6d6
| 364076 ||  || — || December 24, 2005 || Kitt Peak || Spacewatch || — || align=right | 3.4 km || 
|-id=077 bgcolor=#d6d6d6
| 364077 ||  || — || December 22, 2005 || Kitt Peak || Spacewatch || HYG || align=right | 2.9 km || 
|-id=078 bgcolor=#fefefe
| 364078 ||  || — || December 25, 2005 || Kitt Peak || Spacewatch || — || align=right data-sort-value="0.58" | 580 m || 
|-id=079 bgcolor=#d6d6d6
| 364079 ||  || — || December 25, 2005 || Mount Lemmon || Mount Lemmon Survey || — || align=right | 3.1 km || 
|-id=080 bgcolor=#fefefe
| 364080 ||  || — || December 25, 2005 || Mount Lemmon || Mount Lemmon Survey || — || align=right data-sort-value="0.56" | 560 m || 
|-id=081 bgcolor=#fefefe
| 364081 ||  || — || December 25, 2005 || Kitt Peak || Spacewatch || — || align=right data-sort-value="0.64" | 640 m || 
|-id=082 bgcolor=#d6d6d6
| 364082 ||  || — || October 1, 2005 || Mount Lemmon || Mount Lemmon Survey || EOS || align=right | 2.6 km || 
|-id=083 bgcolor=#d6d6d6
| 364083 ||  || — || December 26, 2005 || Kitt Peak || Spacewatch || THM || align=right | 2.4 km || 
|-id=084 bgcolor=#d6d6d6
| 364084 ||  || — || December 24, 2005 || Kitt Peak || Spacewatch || EOS || align=right | 2.1 km || 
|-id=085 bgcolor=#d6d6d6
| 364085 ||  || — || December 25, 2005 || Mount Lemmon || Mount Lemmon Survey || — || align=right | 3.2 km || 
|-id=086 bgcolor=#d6d6d6
| 364086 ||  || — || December 26, 2005 || Mount Lemmon || Mount Lemmon Survey || — || align=right | 3.0 km || 
|-id=087 bgcolor=#d6d6d6
| 364087 ||  || — || November 12, 2005 || Kitt Peak || Spacewatch || — || align=right | 2.6 km || 
|-id=088 bgcolor=#d6d6d6
| 364088 ||  || — || December 26, 2005 || Kitt Peak || Spacewatch || — || align=right | 3.9 km || 
|-id=089 bgcolor=#d6d6d6
| 364089 ||  || — || December 26, 2005 || Kitt Peak || Spacewatch || — || align=right | 2.9 km || 
|-id=090 bgcolor=#d6d6d6
| 364090 ||  || — || December 5, 2005 || Mount Lemmon || Mount Lemmon Survey || — || align=right | 3.0 km || 
|-id=091 bgcolor=#d6d6d6
| 364091 ||  || — || December 24, 2005 || Socorro || LINEAR || TIR || align=right | 3.0 km || 
|-id=092 bgcolor=#d6d6d6
| 364092 ||  || — || December 25, 2005 || Mount Lemmon || Mount Lemmon Survey || — || align=right | 3.4 km || 
|-id=093 bgcolor=#d6d6d6
| 364093 ||  || — || December 28, 2005 || Mount Lemmon || Mount Lemmon Survey || EOS || align=right | 2.3 km || 
|-id=094 bgcolor=#fefefe
| 364094 ||  || — || December 25, 2005 || Kitt Peak || Spacewatch || — || align=right data-sort-value="0.91" | 910 m || 
|-id=095 bgcolor=#d6d6d6
| 364095 ||  || — || October 30, 2005 || Mount Lemmon || Mount Lemmon Survey || — || align=right | 3.9 km || 
|-id=096 bgcolor=#d6d6d6
| 364096 ||  || — || December 25, 2005 || Kitt Peak || Spacewatch || — || align=right | 2.5 km || 
|-id=097 bgcolor=#fefefe
| 364097 ||  || — || December 29, 2005 || Kitt Peak || Spacewatch || — || align=right data-sort-value="0.68" | 680 m || 
|-id=098 bgcolor=#d6d6d6
| 364098 ||  || — || December 27, 2005 || Kitt Peak || Spacewatch || HYG || align=right | 2.9 km || 
|-id=099 bgcolor=#d6d6d6
| 364099 ||  || — || October 27, 2005 || Mount Lemmon || Mount Lemmon Survey || — || align=right | 4.4 km || 
|-id=100 bgcolor=#d6d6d6
| 364100 ||  || — || December 25, 2005 || Kitt Peak || Spacewatch || — || align=right | 2.8 km || 
|}

364101–364200 

|-bgcolor=#d6d6d6
| 364101 ||  || — || November 30, 2005 || Kitt Peak || Spacewatch || — || align=right | 3.7 km || 
|-id=102 bgcolor=#d6d6d6
| 364102 ||  || — || December 2, 2005 || Mount Lemmon || Mount Lemmon Survey || EOS || align=right | 2.5 km || 
|-id=103 bgcolor=#d6d6d6
| 364103 ||  || — || December 4, 2005 || Kitt Peak || Spacewatch || — || align=right | 3.6 km || 
|-id=104 bgcolor=#d6d6d6
| 364104 ||  || — || December 28, 2005 || Kitt Peak || Spacewatch || — || align=right | 2.5 km || 
|-id=105 bgcolor=#d6d6d6
| 364105 ||  || — || November 6, 2005 || Kitt Peak || Spacewatch || — || align=right | 3.4 km || 
|-id=106 bgcolor=#d6d6d6
| 364106 ||  || — || December 28, 2005 || Mount Lemmon || Mount Lemmon Survey || — || align=right | 4.3 km || 
|-id=107 bgcolor=#d6d6d6
| 364107 ||  || — || December 25, 2005 || Mount Lemmon || Mount Lemmon Survey || — || align=right | 4.1 km || 
|-id=108 bgcolor=#d6d6d6
| 364108 ||  || — || December 28, 2005 || Kitt Peak || Spacewatch || EOS || align=right | 2.5 km || 
|-id=109 bgcolor=#d6d6d6
| 364109 ||  || — || January 2, 2006 || Mount Lemmon || Mount Lemmon Survey || — || align=right | 3.1 km || 
|-id=110 bgcolor=#fefefe
| 364110 ||  || — || January 2, 2006 || Catalina || CSS || PHO || align=right | 2.0 km || 
|-id=111 bgcolor=#d6d6d6
| 364111 ||  || — || January 4, 2006 || Kitt Peak || Spacewatch || EMA || align=right | 3.5 km || 
|-id=112 bgcolor=#fefefe
| 364112 ||  || — || January 5, 2006 || Kitt Peak || Spacewatch || — || align=right data-sort-value="0.72" | 720 m || 
|-id=113 bgcolor=#d6d6d6
| 364113 ||  || — || November 30, 2005 || Mount Lemmon || Mount Lemmon Survey || — || align=right | 3.1 km || 
|-id=114 bgcolor=#d6d6d6
| 364114 ||  || — || December 25, 2005 || Kitt Peak || Spacewatch || — || align=right | 2.8 km || 
|-id=115 bgcolor=#d6d6d6
| 364115 ||  || — || December 22, 2005 || Kitt Peak || Spacewatch || EOS || align=right | 2.0 km || 
|-id=116 bgcolor=#d6d6d6
| 364116 ||  || — || January 5, 2006 || Kitt Peak || Spacewatch || — || align=right | 2.9 km || 
|-id=117 bgcolor=#E9E9E9
| 364117 ||  || — || January 8, 2006 || Catalina || CSS || — || align=right | 1.7 km || 
|-id=118 bgcolor=#d6d6d6
| 364118 ||  || — || January 5, 2006 || Kitt Peak || Spacewatch || — || align=right | 3.5 km || 
|-id=119 bgcolor=#d6d6d6
| 364119 ||  || — || January 5, 2006 || Socorro || LINEAR || — || align=right | 3.1 km || 
|-id=120 bgcolor=#d6d6d6
| 364120 ||  || — || January 7, 2006 || Kitt Peak || Spacewatch || — || align=right | 2.7 km || 
|-id=121 bgcolor=#d6d6d6
| 364121 ||  || — || January 5, 2006 || Mount Lemmon || Mount Lemmon Survey || VER || align=right | 2.3 km || 
|-id=122 bgcolor=#E9E9E9
| 364122 ||  || — || January 6, 2006 || Kitt Peak || Spacewatch || GEF || align=right | 1.3 km || 
|-id=123 bgcolor=#fefefe
| 364123 ||  || — || January 23, 2006 || Kitt Peak || Spacewatch || — || align=right data-sort-value="0.64" | 640 m || 
|-id=124 bgcolor=#fefefe
| 364124 ||  || — || January 23, 2006 || Mount Lemmon || Mount Lemmon Survey || — || align=right data-sort-value="0.88" | 880 m || 
|-id=125 bgcolor=#d6d6d6
| 364125 ||  || — || January 25, 2006 || Kitt Peak || Spacewatch || ALA || align=right | 4.6 km || 
|-id=126 bgcolor=#fefefe
| 364126 ||  || — || January 26, 2006 || Kitt Peak || Spacewatch || — || align=right data-sort-value="0.78" | 780 m || 
|-id=127 bgcolor=#fefefe
| 364127 ||  || — || January 26, 2006 || Kitt Peak || Spacewatch || — || align=right data-sort-value="0.91" | 910 m || 
|-id=128 bgcolor=#fefefe
| 364128 ||  || — || January 27, 2006 || Mount Lemmon || Mount Lemmon Survey || — || align=right data-sort-value="0.67" | 670 m || 
|-id=129 bgcolor=#fefefe
| 364129 ||  || — || January 28, 2006 || Kitt Peak || Spacewatch || — || align=right data-sort-value="0.79" | 790 m || 
|-id=130 bgcolor=#d6d6d6
| 364130 ||  || — || January 31, 2006 || Kitt Peak || Spacewatch || — || align=right | 3.4 km || 
|-id=131 bgcolor=#fefefe
| 364131 ||  || — || January 31, 2006 || Kitt Peak || Spacewatch || — || align=right data-sort-value="0.65" | 650 m || 
|-id=132 bgcolor=#d6d6d6
| 364132 ||  || — || January 31, 2006 || Kitt Peak || Spacewatch || — || align=right | 3.1 km || 
|-id=133 bgcolor=#d6d6d6
| 364133 ||  || — || January 23, 2006 || Kitt Peak || Spacewatch || — || align=right | 3.9 km || 
|-id=134 bgcolor=#d6d6d6
| 364134 ||  || — || January 7, 2006 || Mount Lemmon || Mount Lemmon Survey || — || align=right | 3.0 km || 
|-id=135 bgcolor=#fefefe
| 364135 ||  || — || January 27, 2006 || Mount Lemmon || Mount Lemmon Survey || — || align=right data-sort-value="0.68" | 680 m || 
|-id=136 bgcolor=#FFC2E0
| 364136 || 2006 CJ || — || February 1, 2006 || Siding Spring || SSS || ATEPHA || align=right data-sort-value="0.33" | 330 m || 
|-id=137 bgcolor=#fefefe
| 364137 ||  || — || February 1, 2006 || Mount Lemmon || Mount Lemmon Survey || — || align=right data-sort-value="0.67" | 670 m || 
|-id=138 bgcolor=#d6d6d6
| 364138 ||  || — || January 23, 2006 || Mount Lemmon || Mount Lemmon Survey || EOS || align=right | 2.2 km || 
|-id=139 bgcolor=#d6d6d6
| 364139 ||  || — || February 1, 2006 || Mount Lemmon || Mount Lemmon Survey || — || align=right | 4.1 km || 
|-id=140 bgcolor=#fefefe
| 364140 ||  || — || February 21, 2006 || Catalina || CSS || — || align=right | 1.2 km || 
|-id=141 bgcolor=#FA8072
| 364141 ||  || — || February 24, 2006 || Catalina || CSS || — || align=right data-sort-value="0.56" | 560 m || 
|-id=142 bgcolor=#FA8072
| 364142 ||  || — || February 25, 2006 || Socorro || LINEAR || — || align=right data-sort-value="0.89" | 890 m || 
|-id=143 bgcolor=#fefefe
| 364143 ||  || — || February 25, 2006 || Mount Lemmon || Mount Lemmon Survey || — || align=right data-sort-value="0.67" | 670 m || 
|-id=144 bgcolor=#fefefe
| 364144 ||  || — || February 25, 2006 || Mount Lemmon || Mount Lemmon Survey || — || align=right data-sort-value="0.78" | 780 m || 
|-id=145 bgcolor=#fefefe
| 364145 ||  || — || February 25, 2006 || Kitt Peak || Spacewatch || — || align=right data-sort-value="0.66" | 660 m || 
|-id=146 bgcolor=#fefefe
| 364146 ||  || — || February 20, 2006 || Kitt Peak || Spacewatch || FLO || align=right data-sort-value="0.56" | 560 m || 
|-id=147 bgcolor=#d6d6d6
| 364147 ||  || — || March 23, 2006 || Kitt Peak || Spacewatch || EOS || align=right | 2.3 km || 
|-id=148 bgcolor=#fefefe
| 364148 ||  || — || March 23, 2006 || Kitt Peak || Spacewatch || — || align=right data-sort-value="0.64" | 640 m || 
|-id=149 bgcolor=#fefefe
| 364149 ||  || — || March 22, 2006 || Catalina || CSS || — || align=right | 1.1 km || 
|-id=150 bgcolor=#fefefe
| 364150 ||  || — || March 25, 2006 || Catalina || CSS || — || align=right | 1.1 km || 
|-id=151 bgcolor=#fefefe
| 364151 ||  || — || March 24, 2006 || Mount Lemmon || Mount Lemmon Survey || — || align=right data-sort-value="0.75" | 750 m || 
|-id=152 bgcolor=#fefefe
| 364152 ||  || — || April 2, 2006 || Kitt Peak || Spacewatch || — || align=right data-sort-value="0.62" | 620 m || 
|-id=153 bgcolor=#fefefe
| 364153 ||  || — || April 7, 2006 || Catalina || CSS || — || align=right | 1.0 km || 
|-id=154 bgcolor=#d6d6d6
| 364154 ||  || — || December 28, 2005 || Kitt Peak || Spacewatch || EUP || align=right | 4.1 km || 
|-id=155 bgcolor=#fefefe
| 364155 ||  || — || April 8, 2006 || Kitt Peak || Spacewatch || — || align=right data-sort-value="0.61" | 610 m || 
|-id=156 bgcolor=#fefefe
| 364156 ||  || — || April 19, 2006 || Kitt Peak || Spacewatch || FLO || align=right data-sort-value="0.76" | 760 m || 
|-id=157 bgcolor=#fefefe
| 364157 ||  || — || April 20, 2006 || Kitt Peak || Spacewatch || V || align=right data-sort-value="0.75" | 750 m || 
|-id=158 bgcolor=#fefefe
| 364158 ||  || — || April 21, 2006 || Kitt Peak || Spacewatch || V || align=right data-sort-value="0.67" | 670 m || 
|-id=159 bgcolor=#fefefe
| 364159 ||  || — || April 24, 2006 || Kitt Peak || Spacewatch || — || align=right data-sort-value="0.74" | 740 m || 
|-id=160 bgcolor=#fefefe
| 364160 ||  || — || April 26, 2006 || Saint-Sulpice || B. Christophe || V || align=right data-sort-value="0.65" | 650 m || 
|-id=161 bgcolor=#fefefe
| 364161 ||  || — || April 21, 2006 || Catalina || CSS || — || align=right data-sort-value="0.98" | 980 m || 
|-id=162 bgcolor=#fefefe
| 364162 ||  || — || April 30, 2006 || Kitt Peak || Spacewatch || — || align=right data-sort-value="0.72" | 720 m || 
|-id=163 bgcolor=#fefefe
| 364163 ||  || — || April 30, 2006 || Kitt Peak || Spacewatch || V || align=right data-sort-value="0.56" | 560 m || 
|-id=164 bgcolor=#fefefe
| 364164 ||  || — || April 30, 2006 || Kitt Peak || Spacewatch || — || align=right data-sort-value="0.80" | 800 m || 
|-id=165 bgcolor=#fefefe
| 364165 ||  || — || April 28, 2006 || Cerro Tololo || M. W. Buie || — || align=right data-sort-value="0.79" | 790 m || 
|-id=166 bgcolor=#fefefe
| 364166 Trebek || 2006 JB ||  || May 1, 2006 || Wrightwood || J. W. Young || V || align=right data-sort-value="0.68" | 680 m || 
|-id=167 bgcolor=#fefefe
| 364167 ||  || — || May 2, 2006 || Kitt Peak || Spacewatch || — || align=right | 1.4 km || 
|-id=168 bgcolor=#fefefe
| 364168 ||  || — || May 1, 2006 || Kitt Peak || Spacewatch || V || align=right data-sort-value="0.55" | 550 m || 
|-id=169 bgcolor=#fefefe
| 364169 ||  || — || May 5, 2006 || Kitt Peak || Spacewatch || V || align=right data-sort-value="0.75" | 750 m || 
|-id=170 bgcolor=#fefefe
| 364170 ||  || — || May 9, 2006 || Mount Lemmon || Mount Lemmon Survey || — || align=right | 1.2 km || 
|-id=171 bgcolor=#C2E0FF
| 364171 ||  || — || May 1, 2006 || Mauna Kea || Mauna Kea Obs. || cubewano (cold)mooncritical || align=right | 186 km || 
|-id=172 bgcolor=#fefefe
| 364172 ||  || — || May 21, 2006 || Catalina || CSS || — || align=right | 1.4 km || 
|-id=173 bgcolor=#fefefe
| 364173 ||  || — || May 19, 2006 || Mount Lemmon || Mount Lemmon Survey || — || align=right data-sort-value="0.74" | 740 m || 
|-id=174 bgcolor=#fefefe
| 364174 ||  || — || May 21, 2006 || Kitt Peak || Spacewatch || FLO || align=right data-sort-value="0.64" | 640 m || 
|-id=175 bgcolor=#fefefe
| 364175 ||  || — || May 21, 2006 || Kitt Peak || Spacewatch || NYS || align=right data-sort-value="0.46" | 460 m || 
|-id=176 bgcolor=#fefefe
| 364176 ||  || — || May 22, 2006 || Kitt Peak || Spacewatch || V || align=right data-sort-value="0.66" | 660 m || 
|-id=177 bgcolor=#fefefe
| 364177 ||  || — || May 21, 2006 || Mount Lemmon || Mount Lemmon Survey || — || align=right data-sort-value="0.81" | 810 m || 
|-id=178 bgcolor=#fefefe
| 364178 ||  || — || May 25, 2006 || Kitt Peak || Spacewatch || NYS || align=right data-sort-value="0.56" | 560 m || 
|-id=179 bgcolor=#fefefe
| 364179 ||  || — || May 25, 2006 || Mauna Kea || P. A. Wiegert || MAS || align=right data-sort-value="0.62" | 620 m || 
|-id=180 bgcolor=#fefefe
| 364180 ||  || — || July 20, 2006 || Palomar || NEAT || MAS || align=right data-sort-value="0.69" | 690 m || 
|-id=181 bgcolor=#fefefe
| 364181 ||  || — || July 21, 2006 || Mount Lemmon || Mount Lemmon Survey || MAS || align=right data-sort-value="0.73" | 730 m || 
|-id=182 bgcolor=#E9E9E9
| 364182 ||  || — || July 21, 2006 || Mount Lemmon || Mount Lemmon Survey || — || align=right | 2.6 km || 
|-id=183 bgcolor=#fefefe
| 364183 ||  || — || June 3, 2006 || Mount Lemmon || Mount Lemmon Survey || NYS || align=right data-sort-value="0.67" | 670 m || 
|-id=184 bgcolor=#fefefe
| 364184 ||  || — || August 12, 2006 || Palomar || NEAT || V || align=right data-sort-value="0.67" | 670 m || 
|-id=185 bgcolor=#fefefe
| 364185 ||  || — || August 13, 2006 || Palomar || NEAT || — || align=right data-sort-value="0.77" | 770 m || 
|-id=186 bgcolor=#fefefe
| 364186 ||  || — || June 3, 2006 || Mount Lemmon || Mount Lemmon Survey || NYS || align=right data-sort-value="0.64" | 640 m || 
|-id=187 bgcolor=#fefefe
| 364187 ||  || — || August 13, 2006 || Palomar || NEAT || — || align=right data-sort-value="0.76" | 760 m || 
|-id=188 bgcolor=#fefefe
| 364188 ||  || — || March 10, 2005 || Mount Lemmon || Mount Lemmon Survey || MAS || align=right data-sort-value="0.91" | 910 m || 
|-id=189 bgcolor=#fefefe
| 364189 ||  || — || August 13, 2006 || Siding Spring || SSS || PHO || align=right | 1.2 km || 
|-id=190 bgcolor=#fefefe
| 364190 ||  || — || August 12, 2006 || Palomar || NEAT || MAS || align=right data-sort-value="0.90" | 900 m || 
|-id=191 bgcolor=#fefefe
| 364191 ||  || — || August 13, 2006 || Palomar || NEAT || NYS || align=right data-sort-value="0.64" | 640 m || 
|-id=192 bgcolor=#fefefe
| 364192 Qianruhu ||  ||  || August 16, 2006 || Lulin Observatory || Q.-z. Ye, C.-S. Lin || — || align=right data-sort-value="0.98" | 980 m || 
|-id=193 bgcolor=#fefefe
| 364193 ||  || — || August 17, 2006 || Palomar || NEAT || NYS || align=right data-sort-value="0.74" | 740 m || 
|-id=194 bgcolor=#fefefe
| 364194 ||  || — || August 17, 2006 || Palomar || NEAT || — || align=right | 1.6 km || 
|-id=195 bgcolor=#fefefe
| 364195 ||  || — || August 16, 2006 || Siding Spring || SSS || MAS || align=right data-sort-value="0.71" | 710 m || 
|-id=196 bgcolor=#fefefe
| 364196 ||  || — || August 17, 2006 || Palomar || NEAT || — || align=right data-sort-value="0.79" | 790 m || 
|-id=197 bgcolor=#fefefe
| 364197 ||  || — || July 20, 2006 || Palomar || NEAT || NYS || align=right data-sort-value="0.67" | 670 m || 
|-id=198 bgcolor=#fefefe
| 364198 ||  || — || August 18, 2006 || Kitt Peak || Spacewatch || ERI || align=right | 2.1 km || 
|-id=199 bgcolor=#fefefe
| 364199 ||  || — || August 20, 2006 || Palomar || NEAT || — || align=right data-sort-value="0.91" | 910 m || 
|-id=200 bgcolor=#fefefe
| 364200 ||  || — || August 19, 2006 || Anderson Mesa || LONEOS || — || align=right data-sort-value="0.84" | 840 m || 
|}

364201–364300 

|-bgcolor=#fefefe
| 364201 ||  || — || August 21, 2006 || Kitt Peak || Spacewatch || NYS || align=right data-sort-value="0.78" | 780 m || 
|-id=202 bgcolor=#d6d6d6
| 364202 ||  || — || August 24, 2006 || Palomar || NEAT || — || align=right | 2.9 km || 
|-id=203 bgcolor=#fefefe
| 364203 ||  || — || August 16, 2006 || Palomar || NEAT || MAS || align=right data-sort-value="0.96" | 960 m || 
|-id=204 bgcolor=#fefefe
| 364204 ||  || — || August 25, 2006 || Socorro || LINEAR || SVE || align=right | 1.5 km || 
|-id=205 bgcolor=#FA8072
| 364205 ||  || — || August 28, 2006 || Catalina || CSS || — || align=right data-sort-value="0.89" | 890 m || 
|-id=206 bgcolor=#fefefe
| 364206 ||  || — || August 27, 2006 || Anderson Mesa || LONEOS || CIM || align=right | 2.9 km || 
|-id=207 bgcolor=#E9E9E9
| 364207 ||  || — || August 27, 2006 || Anderson Mesa || LONEOS || — || align=right | 2.4 km || 
|-id=208 bgcolor=#fefefe
| 364208 ||  || — || August 27, 2006 || Anderson Mesa || LONEOS || — || align=right data-sort-value="0.88" | 880 m || 
|-id=209 bgcolor=#E9E9E9
| 364209 ||  || — || August 28, 2006 || Catalina || CSS || — || align=right | 1.7 km || 
|-id=210 bgcolor=#E9E9E9
| 364210 ||  || — || August 19, 2006 || Kitt Peak || Spacewatch || — || align=right | 1.2 km || 
|-id=211 bgcolor=#E9E9E9
| 364211 ||  || — || August 21, 2006 || Kitt Peak || Spacewatch || — || align=right | 2.0 km || 
|-id=212 bgcolor=#E9E9E9
| 364212 ||  || — || August 29, 2006 || Kitt Peak || Spacewatch || — || align=right data-sort-value="0.95" | 950 m || 
|-id=213 bgcolor=#fefefe
| 364213 ||  || — || August 29, 2006 || Anderson Mesa || LONEOS || PHO || align=right | 1.2 km || 
|-id=214 bgcolor=#E9E9E9
| 364214 ||  || — || September 14, 2006 || Kitt Peak || Spacewatch || — || align=right | 1.5 km || 
|-id=215 bgcolor=#fefefe
| 364215 ||  || — || September 14, 2006 || Catalina || CSS || — || align=right data-sort-value="0.96" | 960 m || 
|-id=216 bgcolor=#fefefe
| 364216 ||  || — || September 14, 2006 || Catalina || CSS || — || align=right data-sort-value="0.98" | 980 m || 
|-id=217 bgcolor=#fefefe
| 364217 ||  || — || September 14, 2006 || Kitt Peak || Spacewatch || — || align=right data-sort-value="0.85" | 850 m || 
|-id=218 bgcolor=#E9E9E9
| 364218 ||  || — || September 14, 2006 || Kitt Peak || Spacewatch || — || align=right | 1.4 km || 
|-id=219 bgcolor=#E9E9E9
| 364219 ||  || — || September 14, 2006 || Kitt Peak || Spacewatch || — || align=right | 1.3 km || 
|-id=220 bgcolor=#E9E9E9
| 364220 ||  || — || September 14, 2006 || Kitt Peak || Spacewatch || — || align=right | 1.6 km || 
|-id=221 bgcolor=#E9E9E9
| 364221 ||  || — || September 14, 2006 || Kitt Peak || Spacewatch || — || align=right | 1.1 km || 
|-id=222 bgcolor=#E9E9E9
| 364222 ||  || — || September 14, 2006 || Kitt Peak || Spacewatch || — || align=right | 1.1 km || 
|-id=223 bgcolor=#E9E9E9
| 364223 ||  || — || September 15, 2006 || Kitt Peak || Spacewatch || — || align=right | 1.4 km || 
|-id=224 bgcolor=#fefefe
| 364224 ||  || — || April 11, 2005 || Kitt Peak || Spacewatch || — || align=right data-sort-value="0.93" | 930 m || 
|-id=225 bgcolor=#E9E9E9
| 364225 ||  || — || September 17, 2006 || Kitt Peak || Spacewatch || — || align=right | 2.2 km || 
|-id=226 bgcolor=#fefefe
| 364226 ||  || — || August 24, 2006 || Palomar || NEAT || — || align=right data-sort-value="0.93" | 930 m || 
|-id=227 bgcolor=#fefefe
| 364227 ||  || — || September 17, 2006 || Catalina || CSS || NYS || align=right data-sort-value="0.66" | 660 m || 
|-id=228 bgcolor=#fefefe
| 364228 ||  || — || September 16, 2006 || Catalina || CSS || — || align=right | 1.2 km || 
|-id=229 bgcolor=#fefefe
| 364229 ||  || — || September 21, 2006 || Anderson Mesa || LONEOS || NYS || align=right data-sort-value="0.93" | 930 m || 
|-id=230 bgcolor=#E9E9E9
| 364230 ||  || — || September 19, 2006 || Kitt Peak || Spacewatch || — || align=right data-sort-value="0.98" | 980 m || 
|-id=231 bgcolor=#fefefe
| 364231 ||  || — || September 19, 2006 || Kitt Peak || Spacewatch || MAS || align=right data-sort-value="0.65" | 650 m || 
|-id=232 bgcolor=#E9E9E9
| 364232 ||  || — || September 19, 2006 || Kitt Peak || Spacewatch || — || align=right | 1.4 km || 
|-id=233 bgcolor=#d6d6d6
| 364233 ||  || — || September 18, 2006 || Catalina || CSS || — || align=right | 3.7 km || 
|-id=234 bgcolor=#fefefe
| 364234 ||  || — || September 19, 2006 || Kitt Peak || Spacewatch || — || align=right data-sort-value="0.78" | 780 m || 
|-id=235 bgcolor=#E9E9E9
| 364235 ||  || — || September 19, 2006 || Kitt Peak || Spacewatch || — || align=right | 1.4 km || 
|-id=236 bgcolor=#E9E9E9
| 364236 ||  || — || September 19, 2006 || Kitt Peak || Spacewatch || — || align=right | 2.3 km || 
|-id=237 bgcolor=#E9E9E9
| 364237 ||  || — || September 19, 2006 || Kitt Peak || Spacewatch || — || align=right | 1.1 km || 
|-id=238 bgcolor=#E9E9E9
| 364238 ||  || — || June 14, 2005 || Kitt Peak || Spacewatch || EUN || align=right | 1.4 km || 
|-id=239 bgcolor=#E9E9E9
| 364239 ||  || — || September 25, 2006 || Kitt Peak || Spacewatch || — || align=right | 1.6 km || 
|-id=240 bgcolor=#E9E9E9
| 364240 ||  || — || September 25, 2006 || Kitt Peak || Spacewatch || — || align=right | 1.1 km || 
|-id=241 bgcolor=#E9E9E9
| 364241 ||  || — || September 26, 2006 || Kitt Peak || Spacewatch || JUN || align=right | 1.3 km || 
|-id=242 bgcolor=#E9E9E9
| 364242 ||  || — || September 26, 2006 || Mount Lemmon || Mount Lemmon Survey || — || align=right | 3.0 km || 
|-id=243 bgcolor=#fefefe
| 364243 ||  || — || September 26, 2006 || Kitt Peak || Spacewatch || H || align=right data-sort-value="0.53" | 530 m || 
|-id=244 bgcolor=#E9E9E9
| 364244 ||  || — || September 24, 2006 || Kitt Peak || Spacewatch || — || align=right | 1.3 km || 
|-id=245 bgcolor=#E9E9E9
| 364245 ||  || — || September 25, 2006 || Kitt Peak || Spacewatch || — || align=right | 1.1 km || 
|-id=246 bgcolor=#E9E9E9
| 364246 ||  || — || September 25, 2006 || Kitt Peak || Spacewatch || KAZ || align=right | 1.0 km || 
|-id=247 bgcolor=#E9E9E9
| 364247 ||  || — || September 25, 2006 || Mount Lemmon || Mount Lemmon Survey || — || align=right | 3.0 km || 
|-id=248 bgcolor=#E9E9E9
| 364248 ||  || — || September 26, 2006 || Socorro || LINEAR || EUN || align=right | 1.2 km || 
|-id=249 bgcolor=#fefefe
| 364249 ||  || — || September 26, 2006 || Kitt Peak || Spacewatch || LCI || align=right data-sort-value="0.85" | 850 m || 
|-id=250 bgcolor=#fefefe
| 364250 ||  || — || September 25, 2006 || Catalina || CSS || H || align=right data-sort-value="0.75" | 750 m || 
|-id=251 bgcolor=#E9E9E9
| 364251 ||  || — || September 25, 2006 || Kitt Peak || Spacewatch || — || align=right | 2.2 km || 
|-id=252 bgcolor=#d6d6d6
| 364252 ||  || — || March 7, 1997 || Kitt Peak || Spacewatch || — || align=right | 2.2 km || 
|-id=253 bgcolor=#E9E9E9
| 364253 ||  || — || September 17, 2006 || Kitt Peak || Spacewatch || — || align=right | 1.3 km || 
|-id=254 bgcolor=#E9E9E9
| 364254 ||  || — || September 27, 2006 || Kitt Peak || Spacewatch || ADE || align=right | 2.9 km || 
|-id=255 bgcolor=#E9E9E9
| 364255 ||  || — || September 27, 2006 || Kitt Peak || Spacewatch || — || align=right data-sort-value="0.78" | 780 m || 
|-id=256 bgcolor=#E9E9E9
| 364256 ||  || — || September 27, 2006 || Kitt Peak || Spacewatch || — || align=right | 1.9 km || 
|-id=257 bgcolor=#E9E9E9
| 364257 ||  || — || September 28, 2006 || Kitt Peak || Spacewatch || — || align=right | 1.0 km || 
|-id=258 bgcolor=#E9E9E9
| 364258 ||  || — || September 30, 2006 || Catalina || CSS || — || align=right | 1.7 km || 
|-id=259 bgcolor=#E9E9E9
| 364259 ||  || — || September 30, 2006 || Catalina || CSS || — || align=right | 1.9 km || 
|-id=260 bgcolor=#fefefe
| 364260 ||  || — || September 30, 2006 || Catalina || CSS || ERI || align=right | 1.9 km || 
|-id=261 bgcolor=#E9E9E9
| 364261 ||  || — || September 30, 2006 || Mount Lemmon || Mount Lemmon Survey || — || align=right | 2.1 km || 
|-id=262 bgcolor=#E9E9E9
| 364262 ||  || — || September 29, 2006 || Apache Point || A. C. Becker || MAR || align=right | 1.4 km || 
|-id=263 bgcolor=#E9E9E9
| 364263 ||  || — || September 18, 2006 || Catalina || CSS || — || align=right | 1.3 km || 
|-id=264 bgcolor=#fefefe
| 364264 Martymartina ||  ||  || October 11, 2006 || San Marcello || L. Tesi, G. Fagioli || MAS || align=right data-sort-value="0.82" | 820 m || 
|-id=265 bgcolor=#fefefe
| 364265 ||  || — || October 11, 2006 || Kitt Peak || Spacewatch || H || align=right data-sort-value="0.67" | 670 m || 
|-id=266 bgcolor=#E9E9E9
| 364266 ||  || — || October 11, 2006 || Kitt Peak || Spacewatch || MAR || align=right data-sort-value="0.97" | 970 m || 
|-id=267 bgcolor=#E9E9E9
| 364267 ||  || — || October 12, 2006 || Kitt Peak || Spacewatch || — || align=right | 1.3 km || 
|-id=268 bgcolor=#E9E9E9
| 364268 ||  || — || October 12, 2006 || Kitt Peak || Spacewatch || — || align=right | 1.3 km || 
|-id=269 bgcolor=#d6d6d6
| 364269 ||  || — || October 11, 2006 || Palomar || NEAT || — || align=right | 3.6 km || 
|-id=270 bgcolor=#E9E9E9
| 364270 ||  || — || October 12, 2006 || Kitt Peak || Spacewatch || NEM || align=right | 2.5 km || 
|-id=271 bgcolor=#E9E9E9
| 364271 ||  || — || October 12, 2006 || Kitt Peak || Spacewatch || — || align=right | 2.4 km || 
|-id=272 bgcolor=#E9E9E9
| 364272 ||  || — || October 12, 2006 || Palomar || NEAT || — || align=right | 1.7 km || 
|-id=273 bgcolor=#FA8072
| 364273 ||  || — || October 12, 2006 || Kitt Peak || Spacewatch || — || align=right data-sort-value="0.76" | 760 m || 
|-id=274 bgcolor=#E9E9E9
| 364274 ||  || — || October 12, 2006 || Kitt Peak || Spacewatch || — || align=right | 1.9 km || 
|-id=275 bgcolor=#E9E9E9
| 364275 ||  || — || October 12, 2006 || Kitt Peak || Spacewatch || HEN || align=right | 1.2 km || 
|-id=276 bgcolor=#E9E9E9
| 364276 ||  || — || October 12, 2006 || Kitt Peak || Spacewatch || HEN || align=right | 1.00 km || 
|-id=277 bgcolor=#E9E9E9
| 364277 ||  || — || October 12, 2006 || Kitt Peak || Spacewatch || — || align=right | 1.4 km || 
|-id=278 bgcolor=#E9E9E9
| 364278 ||  || — || October 13, 2006 || Kitt Peak || Spacewatch || — || align=right | 1.2 km || 
|-id=279 bgcolor=#E9E9E9
| 364279 ||  || — || September 30, 2006 || Kitt Peak || Spacewatch || HNA || align=right | 2.2 km || 
|-id=280 bgcolor=#fefefe
| 364280 ||  || — || September 19, 2006 || Catalina || CSS || — || align=right data-sort-value="0.90" | 900 m || 
|-id=281 bgcolor=#E9E9E9
| 364281 ||  || — || October 11, 2006 || Palomar || NEAT || — || align=right | 1.5 km || 
|-id=282 bgcolor=#E9E9E9
| 364282 ||  || — || October 11, 2006 || Palomar || NEAT || — || align=right | 2.4 km || 
|-id=283 bgcolor=#E9E9E9
| 364283 ||  || — || October 12, 2006 || Kitt Peak || Spacewatch || — || align=right | 2.9 km || 
|-id=284 bgcolor=#E9E9E9
| 364284 ||  || — || October 2, 2006 || Mount Lemmon || Mount Lemmon Survey || — || align=right | 2.1 km || 
|-id=285 bgcolor=#E9E9E9
| 364285 ||  || — || October 13, 2006 || Kitt Peak || Spacewatch || — || align=right | 1.2 km || 
|-id=286 bgcolor=#E9E9E9
| 364286 ||  || — || October 13, 2006 || Kitt Peak || Spacewatch || WIT || align=right data-sort-value="0.97" | 970 m || 
|-id=287 bgcolor=#E9E9E9
| 364287 ||  || — || October 13, 2006 || Kitt Peak || Spacewatch || — || align=right | 2.5 km || 
|-id=288 bgcolor=#E9E9E9
| 364288 ||  || — || October 13, 2006 || Kitt Peak || Spacewatch || — || align=right | 2.4 km || 
|-id=289 bgcolor=#E9E9E9
| 364289 ||  || — || October 13, 2006 || Kitt Peak || Spacewatch || EUN || align=right | 1.4 km || 
|-id=290 bgcolor=#fefefe
| 364290 ||  || — || October 15, 2006 || Kitt Peak || Spacewatch || H || align=right data-sort-value="0.66" | 660 m || 
|-id=291 bgcolor=#E9E9E9
| 364291 ||  || — || October 13, 2006 || Kitt Peak || Spacewatch || GEF || align=right | 1.6 km || 
|-id=292 bgcolor=#E9E9E9
| 364292 ||  || — || October 15, 2006 || Kitt Peak || Spacewatch || — || align=right | 1.1 km || 
|-id=293 bgcolor=#E9E9E9
| 364293 ||  || — || October 15, 2006 || Kitt Peak || Spacewatch || — || align=right data-sort-value="0.97" | 970 m || 
|-id=294 bgcolor=#fefefe
| 364294 ||  || — || October 9, 2006 || Palomar || NEAT || PHO || align=right | 1.7 km || 
|-id=295 bgcolor=#E9E9E9
| 364295 ||  || — || October 2, 2006 || Mount Lemmon || Mount Lemmon Survey || — || align=right | 1.7 km || 
|-id=296 bgcolor=#E9E9E9
| 364296 ||  || — || October 12, 2006 || Kitt Peak || Spacewatch || — || align=right | 2.1 km || 
|-id=297 bgcolor=#E9E9E9
| 364297 ||  || — || October 4, 2006 || Mount Lemmon || Mount Lemmon Survey || HNS || align=right | 1.4 km || 
|-id=298 bgcolor=#E9E9E9
| 364298 ||  || — || October 4, 2006 || Mount Lemmon || Mount Lemmon Survey || — || align=right | 1.4 km || 
|-id=299 bgcolor=#E9E9E9
| 364299 ||  || — || October 17, 2006 || Piszkéstető || K. Sárneczky || — || align=right | 1.2 km || 
|-id=300 bgcolor=#E9E9E9
| 364300 ||  || — || October 16, 2006 || Catalina || CSS || ADE || align=right | 2.4 km || 
|}

364301–364400 

|-bgcolor=#E9E9E9
| 364301 ||  || — || September 25, 2006 || Mount Lemmon || Mount Lemmon Survey || — || align=right | 2.0 km || 
|-id=302 bgcolor=#fefefe
| 364302 ||  || — || October 17, 2006 || Mount Lemmon || Mount Lemmon Survey || — || align=right data-sort-value="0.90" | 900 m || 
|-id=303 bgcolor=#E9E9E9
| 364303 ||  || — || October 16, 2006 || Kitt Peak || Spacewatch || — || align=right | 1.7 km || 
|-id=304 bgcolor=#E9E9E9
| 364304 ||  || — || October 16, 2006 || Kitt Peak || Spacewatch || — || align=right data-sort-value="0.93" | 930 m || 
|-id=305 bgcolor=#E9E9E9
| 364305 ||  || — || October 16, 2006 || Kitt Peak || Spacewatch || — || align=right | 1.2 km || 
|-id=306 bgcolor=#E9E9E9
| 364306 ||  || — || October 16, 2006 || Catalina || CSS || — || align=right | 1.1 km || 
|-id=307 bgcolor=#E9E9E9
| 364307 ||  || — || October 16, 2006 || Kitt Peak || Spacewatch || PAD || align=right | 2.4 km || 
|-id=308 bgcolor=#E9E9E9
| 364308 ||  || — || September 25, 2006 || Mount Lemmon || Mount Lemmon Survey || — || align=right data-sort-value="0.99" | 990 m || 
|-id=309 bgcolor=#E9E9E9
| 364309 ||  || — || October 16, 2006 || Kitt Peak || Spacewatch || — || align=right data-sort-value="0.94" | 940 m || 
|-id=310 bgcolor=#E9E9E9
| 364310 ||  || — || October 16, 2006 || Kitt Peak || Spacewatch || — || align=right data-sort-value="0.93" | 930 m || 
|-id=311 bgcolor=#E9E9E9
| 364311 ||  || — || October 16, 2006 || Kitt Peak || Spacewatch || — || align=right | 1.3 km || 
|-id=312 bgcolor=#E9E9E9
| 364312 ||  || — || October 16, 2006 || Kitt Peak || Spacewatch || — || align=right | 2.2 km || 
|-id=313 bgcolor=#E9E9E9
| 364313 ||  || — || December 15, 1998 || Caussols || ODAS || — || align=right | 1.0 km || 
|-id=314 bgcolor=#E9E9E9
| 364314 ||  || — || October 22, 2006 || Jornada || D. S. Dixon || — || align=right | 2.0 km || 
|-id=315 bgcolor=#fefefe
| 364315 ||  || — || October 16, 2006 || Catalina || CSS || critical || align=right data-sort-value="0.90" | 900 m || 
|-id=316 bgcolor=#E9E9E9
| 364316 ||  || — || October 16, 2006 || Catalina || CSS || PAL || align=right | 4.0 km || 
|-id=317 bgcolor=#E9E9E9
| 364317 ||  || — || October 16, 2006 || Kitt Peak || Spacewatch || — || align=right | 1.8 km || 
|-id=318 bgcolor=#E9E9E9
| 364318 ||  || — || October 17, 2006 || Kitt Peak || Spacewatch || — || align=right | 1.3 km || 
|-id=319 bgcolor=#E9E9E9
| 364319 ||  || — || October 17, 2006 || Mount Lemmon || Mount Lemmon Survey || HEN || align=right | 2.1 km || 
|-id=320 bgcolor=#E9E9E9
| 364320 ||  || — || October 17, 2006 || Mount Lemmon || Mount Lemmon Survey || — || align=right | 1.4 km || 
|-id=321 bgcolor=#E9E9E9
| 364321 ||  || — || October 17, 2006 || Mount Lemmon || Mount Lemmon Survey || — || align=right | 1.1 km || 
|-id=322 bgcolor=#E9E9E9
| 364322 ||  || — || October 17, 2006 || Mount Lemmon || Mount Lemmon Survey || — || align=right | 2.4 km || 
|-id=323 bgcolor=#E9E9E9
| 364323 ||  || — || October 17, 2006 || Kitt Peak || Spacewatch || — || align=right | 1.3 km || 
|-id=324 bgcolor=#E9E9E9
| 364324 ||  || — || October 18, 2006 || Kitt Peak || Spacewatch || EUN || align=right | 1.2 km || 
|-id=325 bgcolor=#d6d6d6
| 364325 ||  || — || October 18, 2006 || Kitt Peak || Spacewatch || TRE || align=right | 2.3 km || 
|-id=326 bgcolor=#E9E9E9
| 364326 ||  || — || October 19, 2006 || Kitt Peak || Spacewatch || — || align=right | 3.2 km || 
|-id=327 bgcolor=#E9E9E9
| 364327 ||  || — || October 19, 2006 || Kitt Peak || Spacewatch || AER || align=right | 1.1 km || 
|-id=328 bgcolor=#E9E9E9
| 364328 ||  || — || October 19, 2006 || Kitt Peak || Spacewatch || — || align=right | 1.4 km || 
|-id=329 bgcolor=#E9E9E9
| 364329 ||  || — || October 19, 2006 || Kitt Peak || Spacewatch || HNS || align=right | 1.1 km || 
|-id=330 bgcolor=#E9E9E9
| 364330 ||  || — || October 19, 2006 || Kitt Peak || Spacewatch || — || align=right | 2.3 km || 
|-id=331 bgcolor=#E9E9E9
| 364331 ||  || — || October 2, 2006 || Mount Lemmon || Mount Lemmon Survey || INO || align=right | 1.3 km || 
|-id=332 bgcolor=#E9E9E9
| 364332 ||  || — || October 19, 2006 || Catalina || CSS || — || align=right | 2.5 km || 
|-id=333 bgcolor=#E9E9E9
| 364333 ||  || — || October 19, 2006 || Mount Lemmon || Mount Lemmon Survey || — || align=right | 1.2 km || 
|-id=334 bgcolor=#E9E9E9
| 364334 ||  || — || October 19, 2006 || Kitt Peak || Spacewatch || — || align=right | 1.9 km || 
|-id=335 bgcolor=#E9E9E9
| 364335 ||  || — || October 19, 2006 || Kitt Peak || Spacewatch || — || align=right | 2.0 km || 
|-id=336 bgcolor=#E9E9E9
| 364336 ||  || — || October 19, 2006 || Mount Lemmon || Mount Lemmon Survey || — || align=right | 2.5 km || 
|-id=337 bgcolor=#E9E9E9
| 364337 ||  || — || October 19, 2006 || Palomar || NEAT || — || align=right | 1.7 km || 
|-id=338 bgcolor=#E9E9E9
| 364338 ||  || — || October 20, 2006 || Kitt Peak || Spacewatch || JUN || align=right | 1.3 km || 
|-id=339 bgcolor=#E9E9E9
| 364339 ||  || — || October 21, 2006 || Mount Lemmon || Mount Lemmon Survey || — || align=right | 1.8 km || 
|-id=340 bgcolor=#fefefe
| 364340 ||  || — || October 2, 2006 || Mount Lemmon || Mount Lemmon Survey || — || align=right data-sort-value="0.90" | 900 m || 
|-id=341 bgcolor=#E9E9E9
| 364341 ||  || — || October 21, 2006 || Mount Lemmon || Mount Lemmon Survey || — || align=right | 1.2 km || 
|-id=342 bgcolor=#E9E9E9
| 364342 ||  || — || February 7, 1999 || Kitt Peak || Spacewatch || — || align=right | 1.5 km || 
|-id=343 bgcolor=#E9E9E9
| 364343 ||  || — || October 16, 2006 || Catalina || CSS || — || align=right | 2.7 km || 
|-id=344 bgcolor=#fefefe
| 364344 ||  || — || October 16, 2006 || Catalina || CSS || — || align=right data-sort-value="0.87" | 870 m || 
|-id=345 bgcolor=#fefefe
| 364345 ||  || — || October 19, 2006 || Catalina || CSS || V || align=right data-sort-value="0.85" | 850 m || 
|-id=346 bgcolor=#E9E9E9
| 364346 ||  || — || October 20, 2006 || Kitt Peak || Spacewatch || — || align=right | 2.7 km || 
|-id=347 bgcolor=#E9E9E9
| 364347 ||  || — || October 12, 2006 || Kitt Peak || Spacewatch || — || align=right | 1.4 km || 
|-id=348 bgcolor=#E9E9E9
| 364348 ||  || — || September 26, 2006 || Mount Lemmon || Mount Lemmon Survey || — || align=right data-sort-value="0.80" | 800 m || 
|-id=349 bgcolor=#E9E9E9
| 364349 ||  || — || October 21, 2006 || Mount Lemmon || Mount Lemmon Survey || — || align=right | 2.1 km || 
|-id=350 bgcolor=#E9E9E9
| 364350 ||  || — || April 16, 2004 || Palomar || NEAT || EUN || align=right | 1.3 km || 
|-id=351 bgcolor=#fefefe
| 364351 ||  || — || October 23, 2006 || Kitt Peak || Spacewatch || NYS || align=right data-sort-value="0.58" | 580 m || 
|-id=352 bgcolor=#E9E9E9
| 364352 ||  || — || October 27, 2006 || Mount Lemmon || Mount Lemmon Survey || — || align=right | 3.4 km || 
|-id=353 bgcolor=#fefefe
| 364353 ||  || — || October 17, 2006 || Catalina || CSS || — || align=right data-sort-value="0.79" | 790 m || 
|-id=354 bgcolor=#E9E9E9
| 364354 ||  || — || October 20, 2006 || Palomar || NEAT || MAR || align=right | 1.6 km || 
|-id=355 bgcolor=#E9E9E9
| 364355 ||  || — || October 21, 2006 || Palomar || NEAT || — || align=right | 1.1 km || 
|-id=356 bgcolor=#E9E9E9
| 364356 ||  || — || October 23, 2006 || Kitt Peak || Spacewatch || — || align=right | 1.9 km || 
|-id=357 bgcolor=#d6d6d6
| 364357 ||  || — || October 27, 2006 || Mount Lemmon || Mount Lemmon Survey || EOS || align=right | 1.5 km || 
|-id=358 bgcolor=#E9E9E9
| 364358 ||  || — || October 27, 2006 || Mount Lemmon || Mount Lemmon Survey || — || align=right | 1.2 km || 
|-id=359 bgcolor=#E9E9E9
| 364359 ||  || — || October 28, 2006 || Mount Lemmon || Mount Lemmon Survey || — || align=right | 1.1 km || 
|-id=360 bgcolor=#E9E9E9
| 364360 ||  || — || October 27, 2006 || Kitt Peak || Spacewatch || MAR || align=right | 1.3 km || 
|-id=361 bgcolor=#E9E9E9
| 364361 ||  || — || October 27, 2006 || Mount Lemmon || Mount Lemmon Survey || — || align=right | 2.1 km || 
|-id=362 bgcolor=#E9E9E9
| 364362 ||  || — || October 28, 2006 || Mount Lemmon || Mount Lemmon Survey || HNS || align=right | 1.1 km || 
|-id=363 bgcolor=#E9E9E9
| 364363 ||  || — || October 28, 2006 || Kitt Peak || Spacewatch || — || align=right data-sort-value="0.71" | 710 m || 
|-id=364 bgcolor=#E9E9E9
| 364364 ||  || — || October 28, 2006 || Mount Lemmon || Mount Lemmon Survey || — || align=right | 1.3 km || 
|-id=365 bgcolor=#d6d6d6
| 364365 ||  || — || September 30, 2006 || Mount Lemmon || Mount Lemmon Survey || EOS || align=right | 1.7 km || 
|-id=366 bgcolor=#fefefe
| 364366 ||  || — || October 19, 2006 || Kitt Peak || M. W. Buie || — || align=right data-sort-value="0.62" | 620 m || 
|-id=367 bgcolor=#E9E9E9
| 364367 ||  || — || November 20, 2006 || Kitt Peak || Spacewatch || — || align=right | 1.5 km || 
|-id=368 bgcolor=#E9E9E9
| 364368 ||  || — || October 20, 2006 || Kitt Peak || Spacewatch || — || align=right | 1.3 km || 
|-id=369 bgcolor=#E9E9E9
| 364369 ||  || — || October 17, 2006 || Mount Lemmon || Mount Lemmon Survey || — || align=right | 1.1 km || 
|-id=370 bgcolor=#E9E9E9
| 364370 ||  || — || November 9, 2006 || Kitt Peak || Spacewatch || — || align=right | 1.1 km || 
|-id=371 bgcolor=#E9E9E9
| 364371 ||  || — || November 10, 2006 || Kitt Peak || Spacewatch || MRX || align=right | 1.0 km || 
|-id=372 bgcolor=#E9E9E9
| 364372 ||  || — || September 30, 2006 || Catalina || CSS || — || align=right | 2.9 km || 
|-id=373 bgcolor=#E9E9E9
| 364373 ||  || — || November 9, 2006 || Kitt Peak || Spacewatch || — || align=right | 2.1 km || 
|-id=374 bgcolor=#E9E9E9
| 364374 ||  || — || November 9, 2006 || Kitt Peak || Spacewatch || — || align=right | 1.1 km || 
|-id=375 bgcolor=#E9E9E9
| 364375 ||  || — || November 9, 2006 || Kitt Peak || Spacewatch || WIT || align=right | 1.1 km || 
|-id=376 bgcolor=#E9E9E9
| 364376 ||  || — || November 9, 2006 || Kitt Peak || Spacewatch || — || align=right | 1.4 km || 
|-id=377 bgcolor=#E9E9E9
| 364377 ||  || — || October 31, 2006 || Kitt Peak || Spacewatch || — || align=right | 1.3 km || 
|-id=378 bgcolor=#d6d6d6
| 364378 ||  || — || October 19, 2006 || Mount Lemmon || Mount Lemmon Survey || — || align=right | 2.6 km || 
|-id=379 bgcolor=#E9E9E9
| 364379 ||  || — || November 10, 2006 || Kitt Peak || Spacewatch || — || align=right | 1.4 km || 
|-id=380 bgcolor=#E9E9E9
| 364380 ||  || — || November 10, 2006 || Kitt Peak || Spacewatch || EUN || align=right | 1.4 km || 
|-id=381 bgcolor=#E9E9E9
| 364381 ||  || — || November 10, 2006 || Kitt Peak || Spacewatch || — || align=right | 1.6 km || 
|-id=382 bgcolor=#E9E9E9
| 364382 ||  || — || November 10, 2006 || Kitt Peak || Spacewatch || HOF || align=right | 2.5 km || 
|-id=383 bgcolor=#E9E9E9
| 364383 ||  || — || November 11, 2006 || Mount Lemmon || Mount Lemmon Survey || DOR || align=right | 2.3 km || 
|-id=384 bgcolor=#E9E9E9
| 364384 ||  || — || September 28, 2006 || Mount Lemmon || Mount Lemmon Survey || ADE || align=right | 2.5 km || 
|-id=385 bgcolor=#E9E9E9
| 364385 ||  || — || November 11, 2006 || Kitt Peak || Spacewatch || — || align=right | 2.1 km || 
|-id=386 bgcolor=#E9E9E9
| 364386 ||  || — || November 11, 2006 || Mount Lemmon || Mount Lemmon Survey || — || align=right data-sort-value="0.95" | 950 m || 
|-id=387 bgcolor=#E9E9E9
| 364387 ||  || — || November 11, 2006 || Kitt Peak || Spacewatch || — || align=right | 1.1 km || 
|-id=388 bgcolor=#E9E9E9
| 364388 ||  || — || November 11, 2006 || Kitt Peak || Spacewatch || MRX || align=right | 1.0 km || 
|-id=389 bgcolor=#E9E9E9
| 364389 ||  || — || November 11, 2006 || Kitt Peak || Spacewatch || — || align=right | 1.4 km || 
|-id=390 bgcolor=#E9E9E9
| 364390 ||  || — || November 11, 2006 || Kitt Peak || Spacewatch || MAR || align=right | 1.2 km || 
|-id=391 bgcolor=#E9E9E9
| 364391 ||  || — || November 12, 2006 || Mount Lemmon || Mount Lemmon Survey || — || align=right | 1.7 km || 
|-id=392 bgcolor=#E9E9E9
| 364392 ||  || — || November 2, 2006 || Kitt Peak || Spacewatch || MAR || align=right | 1.2 km || 
|-id=393 bgcolor=#E9E9E9
| 364393 ||  || — || November 13, 2006 || Mount Lemmon || Mount Lemmon Survey || EUN || align=right | 1.6 km || 
|-id=394 bgcolor=#E9E9E9
| 364394 ||  || — || November 13, 2006 || Catalina || CSS || EUN || align=right | 1.6 km || 
|-id=395 bgcolor=#E9E9E9
| 364395 ||  || — || October 19, 2006 || Kitt Peak || Spacewatch || — || align=right | 1.2 km || 
|-id=396 bgcolor=#E9E9E9
| 364396 ||  || — || June 29, 2005 || Palomar || NEAT || MAR || align=right | 1.3 km || 
|-id=397 bgcolor=#E9E9E9
| 364397 ||  || — || November 15, 2006 || Catalina || CSS || — || align=right | 1.3 km || 
|-id=398 bgcolor=#E9E9E9
| 364398 ||  || — || November 15, 2006 || Socorro || LINEAR || — || align=right | 2.6 km || 
|-id=399 bgcolor=#E9E9E9
| 364399 ||  || — || September 27, 2006 || Mount Lemmon || Mount Lemmon Survey || HNS || align=right | 1.4 km || 
|-id=400 bgcolor=#E9E9E9
| 364400 ||  || — || November 11, 2006 || Mount Lemmon || Mount Lemmon Survey || — || align=right | 2.7 km || 
|}

364401–364500 

|-bgcolor=#E9E9E9
| 364401 ||  || — || November 12, 2006 || Mount Lemmon || Mount Lemmon Survey || AER || align=right | 1.5 km || 
|-id=402 bgcolor=#E9E9E9
| 364402 ||  || — || October 17, 2006 || Mount Lemmon || Mount Lemmon Survey || — || align=right | 1.1 km || 
|-id=403 bgcolor=#E9E9E9
| 364403 ||  || — || October 20, 2006 || Mount Lemmon || Mount Lemmon Survey || — || align=right | 1.1 km || 
|-id=404 bgcolor=#E9E9E9
| 364404 ||  || — || November 13, 2006 || Catalina || CSS || CLO || align=right | 2.7 km || 
|-id=405 bgcolor=#E9E9E9
| 364405 ||  || — || November 14, 2006 || Kitt Peak || Spacewatch || — || align=right | 1.1 km || 
|-id=406 bgcolor=#E9E9E9
| 364406 ||  || — || November 14, 2006 || Kitt Peak || Spacewatch || — || align=right | 1.9 km || 
|-id=407 bgcolor=#E9E9E9
| 364407 ||  || — || November 14, 2006 || Catalina || CSS || — || align=right | 1.8 km || 
|-id=408 bgcolor=#E9E9E9
| 364408 ||  || — || November 15, 2006 || Kitt Peak || Spacewatch || AST || align=right | 1.8 km || 
|-id=409 bgcolor=#E9E9E9
| 364409 ||  || — || October 31, 2006 || Mount Lemmon || Mount Lemmon Survey || — || align=right | 1.8 km || 
|-id=410 bgcolor=#d6d6d6
| 364410 ||  || — || November 11, 2006 || Catalina || CSS || — || align=right | 2.7 km || 
|-id=411 bgcolor=#E9E9E9
| 364411 ||  || — || November 11, 2006 || Kitt Peak || Spacewatch || — || align=right data-sort-value="0.94" | 940 m || 
|-id=412 bgcolor=#fefefe
| 364412 ||  || — || November 17, 2006 || Kitt Peak || Spacewatch || H || align=right data-sort-value="0.80" | 800 m || 
|-id=413 bgcolor=#fefefe
| 364413 ||  || — || November 21, 2006 || Catalina || CSS || H || align=right data-sort-value="0.78" | 780 m || 
|-id=414 bgcolor=#fefefe
| 364414 ||  || — || November 19, 2006 || Needville || Needville Obs. || H || align=right data-sort-value="0.57" | 570 m || 
|-id=415 bgcolor=#E9E9E9
| 364415 ||  || — || November 16, 2006 || Kitt Peak || Spacewatch || — || align=right | 1.7 km || 
|-id=416 bgcolor=#E9E9E9
| 364416 ||  || — || October 23, 2006 || Mount Lemmon || Mount Lemmon Survey || — || align=right | 1.2 km || 
|-id=417 bgcolor=#E9E9E9
| 364417 ||  || — || November 16, 2006 || Mount Lemmon || Mount Lemmon Survey || — || align=right | 1.7 km || 
|-id=418 bgcolor=#E9E9E9
| 364418 ||  || — || November 17, 2006 || Mount Lemmon || Mount Lemmon Survey || — || align=right | 1.1 km || 
|-id=419 bgcolor=#E9E9E9
| 364419 ||  || — || September 27, 2006 || Mount Lemmon || Mount Lemmon Survey || — || align=right | 1.1 km || 
|-id=420 bgcolor=#E9E9E9
| 364420 ||  || — || November 16, 2006 || Kitt Peak || Spacewatch || — || align=right | 1.0 km || 
|-id=421 bgcolor=#E9E9E9
| 364421 ||  || — || November 16, 2006 || Kitt Peak || Spacewatch || — || align=right | 1.6 km || 
|-id=422 bgcolor=#E9E9E9
| 364422 ||  || — || November 17, 2006 || Kitt Peak || Spacewatch || — || align=right | 1.6 km || 
|-id=423 bgcolor=#fefefe
| 364423 ||  || — || November 18, 2006 || Kitt Peak || Spacewatch || — || align=right data-sort-value="0.93" | 930 m || 
|-id=424 bgcolor=#E9E9E9
| 364424 ||  || — || November 18, 2006 || Kitt Peak || Spacewatch || NEM || align=right | 2.1 km || 
|-id=425 bgcolor=#E9E9E9
| 364425 ||  || — || October 20, 2006 || Mount Lemmon || Mount Lemmon Survey || — || align=right | 1.1 km || 
|-id=426 bgcolor=#E9E9E9
| 364426 ||  || — || November 19, 2006 || Socorro || LINEAR || — || align=right | 2.1 km || 
|-id=427 bgcolor=#E9E9E9
| 364427 ||  || — || November 19, 2006 || Kitt Peak || Spacewatch || MRX || align=right | 1.1 km || 
|-id=428 bgcolor=#E9E9E9
| 364428 ||  || — || November 11, 2006 || Kitt Peak || Spacewatch || — || align=right | 1.8 km || 
|-id=429 bgcolor=#E9E9E9
| 364429 ||  || — || November 19, 2006 || Catalina || CSS || — || align=right | 2.1 km || 
|-id=430 bgcolor=#E9E9E9
| 364430 ||  || — || November 19, 2006 || Catalina || CSS || MAR || align=right | 1.2 km || 
|-id=431 bgcolor=#d6d6d6
| 364431 ||  || — || November 11, 2006 || Mount Lemmon || Mount Lemmon Survey || — || align=right | 3.1 km || 
|-id=432 bgcolor=#E9E9E9
| 364432 ||  || — || October 22, 2006 || Mount Lemmon || Mount Lemmon Survey || — || align=right | 1.2 km || 
|-id=433 bgcolor=#E9E9E9
| 364433 ||  || — || November 20, 2006 || Kitt Peak || Spacewatch || HEN || align=right | 1.1 km || 
|-id=434 bgcolor=#E9E9E9
| 364434 ||  || — || October 19, 2006 || Mount Lemmon || Mount Lemmon Survey || — || align=right | 1.8 km || 
|-id=435 bgcolor=#E9E9E9
| 364435 ||  || — || November 24, 2006 || Mount Lemmon || Mount Lemmon Survey || AGN || align=right data-sort-value="0.91" | 910 m || 
|-id=436 bgcolor=#E9E9E9
| 364436 ||  || — || November 19, 2006 || Kitt Peak || Spacewatch || — || align=right data-sort-value="0.90" | 900 m || 
|-id=437 bgcolor=#E9E9E9
| 364437 ||  || — || October 23, 2006 || Mount Lemmon || Mount Lemmon Survey || — || align=right | 1.4 km || 
|-id=438 bgcolor=#E9E9E9
| 364438 ||  || — || November 23, 2006 || Mount Lemmon || Mount Lemmon Survey || — || align=right | 2.4 km || 
|-id=439 bgcolor=#E9E9E9
| 364439 ||  || — || November 25, 2006 || Mount Lemmon || Mount Lemmon Survey || DOR || align=right | 2.6 km || 
|-id=440 bgcolor=#fefefe
| 364440 ||  || — || November 27, 2006 || Kitt Peak || Spacewatch || H || align=right data-sort-value="0.52" | 520 m || 
|-id=441 bgcolor=#fefefe
| 364441 ||  || — || December 11, 2006 || Socorro || LINEAR || H || align=right data-sort-value="0.66" | 660 m || 
|-id=442 bgcolor=#E9E9E9
| 364442 ||  || — || December 6, 2006 || Palomar || NEAT || ADE || align=right | 2.3 km || 
|-id=443 bgcolor=#E9E9E9
| 364443 ||  || — || December 10, 2006 || Kitt Peak || Spacewatch || — || align=right | 1.3 km || 
|-id=444 bgcolor=#d6d6d6
| 364444 ||  || — || December 11, 2006 || Kitt Peak || Spacewatch || — || align=right | 3.2 km || 
|-id=445 bgcolor=#E9E9E9
| 364445 ||  || — || December 12, 2006 || Catalina || CSS || — || align=right | 3.3 km || 
|-id=446 bgcolor=#E9E9E9
| 364446 ||  || — || December 13, 2006 || Catalina || CSS || — || align=right | 1.4 km || 
|-id=447 bgcolor=#E9E9E9
| 364447 ||  || — || September 26, 2006 || Kitt Peak || Spacewatch || — || align=right | 1.3 km || 
|-id=448 bgcolor=#E9E9E9
| 364448 ||  || — || November 21, 2006 || Mount Lemmon || Mount Lemmon Survey || — || align=right | 2.7 km || 
|-id=449 bgcolor=#E9E9E9
| 364449 ||  || — || December 11, 2006 || Catalina || CSS || — || align=right | 2.0 km || 
|-id=450 bgcolor=#fefefe
| 364450 ||  || — || December 17, 2006 || Mount Lemmon || Mount Lemmon Survey || — || align=right | 1.0 km || 
|-id=451 bgcolor=#E9E9E9
| 364451 ||  || — || December 20, 2006 || Palomar || NEAT || — || align=right | 1.9 km || 
|-id=452 bgcolor=#E9E9E9
| 364452 ||  || — || December 20, 2006 || Palomar || NEAT || — || align=right | 1.3 km || 
|-id=453 bgcolor=#d6d6d6
| 364453 ||  || — || September 13, 2005 || Kitt Peak || Spacewatch || KOR || align=right | 1.3 km || 
|-id=454 bgcolor=#d6d6d6
| 364454 ||  || — || December 21, 2006 || Kitt Peak || Spacewatch || — || align=right | 3.5 km || 
|-id=455 bgcolor=#d6d6d6
| 364455 ||  || — || December 25, 2006 || Catalina || CSS || — || align=right | 2.8 km || 
|-id=456 bgcolor=#E9E9E9
| 364456 ||  || — || January 8, 2007 || Kitt Peak || Spacewatch || — || align=right | 2.2 km || 
|-id=457 bgcolor=#E9E9E9
| 364457 ||  || — || January 10, 2007 || Nyukasa || Mount Nyukasa Stn. || — || align=right | 1.5 km || 
|-id=458 bgcolor=#fefefe
| 364458 ||  || — || January 10, 2007 || Mount Lemmon || Mount Lemmon Survey || H || align=right data-sort-value="0.61" | 610 m || 
|-id=459 bgcolor=#d6d6d6
| 364459 ||  || — || January 15, 2007 || Catalina || CSS || — || align=right | 3.7 km || 
|-id=460 bgcolor=#fefefe
| 364460 ||  || — || January 17, 2007 || Kitt Peak || Spacewatch || H || align=right data-sort-value="0.67" | 670 m || 
|-id=461 bgcolor=#fefefe
| 364461 ||  || — || January 16, 2007 || Socorro || LINEAR || H || align=right data-sort-value="0.84" | 840 m || 
|-id=462 bgcolor=#E9E9E9
| 364462 ||  || — || January 24, 2007 || Mount Lemmon || Mount Lemmon Survey || HOF || align=right | 2.9 km || 
|-id=463 bgcolor=#d6d6d6
| 364463 ||  || — || January 27, 2007 || Mount Lemmon || Mount Lemmon Survey || — || align=right | 2.3 km || 
|-id=464 bgcolor=#d6d6d6
| 364464 ||  || — || January 27, 2007 || Kitt Peak || Spacewatch || — || align=right | 2.4 km || 
|-id=465 bgcolor=#d6d6d6
| 364465 ||  || — || February 6, 2007 || Kitt Peak || Spacewatch || — || align=right | 2.5 km || 
|-id=466 bgcolor=#d6d6d6
| 364466 ||  || — || February 6, 2007 || Mount Lemmon || Mount Lemmon Survey || — || align=right | 2.6 km || 
|-id=467 bgcolor=#d6d6d6
| 364467 ||  || — || January 27, 2007 || Kitt Peak || Spacewatch || — || align=right | 2.7 km || 
|-id=468 bgcolor=#E9E9E9
| 364468 ||  || — || January 27, 2007 || Kitt Peak || Spacewatch || — || align=right | 2.2 km || 
|-id=469 bgcolor=#d6d6d6
| 364469 ||  || — || February 9, 2007 || Catalina || CSS || — || align=right | 3.0 km || 
|-id=470 bgcolor=#d6d6d6
| 364470 ||  || — || February 9, 2007 || Kitt Peak || Spacewatch || — || align=right | 3.6 km || 
|-id=471 bgcolor=#d6d6d6
| 364471 ||  || — || February 17, 2007 || Kitt Peak || Spacewatch || — || align=right | 3.0 km || 
|-id=472 bgcolor=#d6d6d6
| 364472 ||  || — || December 27, 2006 || Mount Lemmon || Mount Lemmon Survey || HYG || align=right | 2.6 km || 
|-id=473 bgcolor=#d6d6d6
| 364473 ||  || — || January 27, 2007 || Mount Lemmon || Mount Lemmon Survey || — || align=right | 2.4 km || 
|-id=474 bgcolor=#d6d6d6
| 364474 ||  || — || February 17, 2007 || Kitt Peak || Spacewatch || — || align=right | 1.8 km || 
|-id=475 bgcolor=#d6d6d6
| 364475 ||  || — || February 17, 2007 || Kitt Peak || Spacewatch || 637 || align=right | 2.7 km || 
|-id=476 bgcolor=#d6d6d6
| 364476 ||  || — || January 27, 2007 || Mount Lemmon || Mount Lemmon Survey || — || align=right | 2.8 km || 
|-id=477 bgcolor=#d6d6d6
| 364477 ||  || — || February 17, 2007 || Kitt Peak || Spacewatch || — || align=right | 2.8 km || 
|-id=478 bgcolor=#d6d6d6
| 364478 ||  || — || February 17, 2007 || Kitt Peak || Spacewatch || EOS || align=right | 2.1 km || 
|-id=479 bgcolor=#d6d6d6
| 364479 ||  || — || February 17, 2007 || Kitt Peak || Spacewatch || THM || align=right | 2.5 km || 
|-id=480 bgcolor=#d6d6d6
| 364480 ||  || — || February 17, 2007 || Kitt Peak || Spacewatch || THM || align=right | 2.3 km || 
|-id=481 bgcolor=#d6d6d6
| 364481 ||  || — || February 17, 2007 || Kitt Peak || Spacewatch || — || align=right | 3.5 km || 
|-id=482 bgcolor=#fefefe
| 364482 ||  || — || February 17, 2007 || Catalina || CSS || H || align=right data-sort-value="0.91" | 910 m || 
|-id=483 bgcolor=#d6d6d6
| 364483 ||  || — || February 21, 2007 || Kitt Peak || Spacewatch || TIR || align=right | 3.0 km || 
|-id=484 bgcolor=#d6d6d6
| 364484 ||  || — || September 28, 1994 || Kitt Peak || Spacewatch || KOR || align=right | 1.6 km || 
|-id=485 bgcolor=#d6d6d6
| 364485 ||  || — || February 21, 2007 || Kitt Peak || Spacewatch || THM || align=right | 2.2 km || 
|-id=486 bgcolor=#d6d6d6
| 364486 ||  || — || February 23, 2007 || Kitt Peak || Spacewatch || — || align=right | 4.2 km || 
|-id=487 bgcolor=#d6d6d6
| 364487 ||  || — || February 23, 2007 || Mount Lemmon || Mount Lemmon Survey || — || align=right | 2.6 km || 
|-id=488 bgcolor=#d6d6d6
| 364488 ||  || — || February 25, 2007 || Mount Lemmon || Mount Lemmon Survey || — || align=right | 2.4 km || 
|-id=489 bgcolor=#d6d6d6
| 364489 ||  || — || February 17, 2007 || Kitt Peak || Spacewatch || — || align=right | 1.9 km || 
|-id=490 bgcolor=#d6d6d6
| 364490 ||  || — || February 26, 2007 || Mount Lemmon || Mount Lemmon Survey || HYG || align=right | 2.7 km || 
|-id=491 bgcolor=#d6d6d6
| 364491 ||  || — || February 27, 2007 || Kitt Peak || Spacewatch || — || align=right | 3.8 km || 
|-id=492 bgcolor=#d6d6d6
| 364492 ||  || — || February 21, 2007 || Kitt Peak || Spacewatch || — || align=right | 2.6 km || 
|-id=493 bgcolor=#d6d6d6
| 364493 ||  || — || March 9, 2007 || Mount Lemmon || Mount Lemmon Survey || BRA || align=right | 1.9 km || 
|-id=494 bgcolor=#d6d6d6
| 364494 ||  || — || March 9, 2007 || Palomar || NEAT || URS || align=right | 4.6 km || 
|-id=495 bgcolor=#E9E9E9
| 364495 ||  || — || March 9, 2007 || Kitt Peak || Spacewatch || INO || align=right | 1.6 km || 
|-id=496 bgcolor=#d6d6d6
| 364496 ||  || — || March 9, 2007 || Palomar || NEAT || — || align=right | 3.3 km || 
|-id=497 bgcolor=#d6d6d6
| 364497 ||  || — || February 6, 2007 || Kitt Peak || Spacewatch || — || align=right | 3.1 km || 
|-id=498 bgcolor=#d6d6d6
| 364498 ||  || — || March 10, 2007 || Eskridge || G. Hug || EOS || align=right | 2.3 km || 
|-id=499 bgcolor=#d6d6d6
| 364499 ||  || — || March 11, 2007 || Mount Lemmon || Mount Lemmon Survey || EUP || align=right | 4.1 km || 
|-id=500 bgcolor=#d6d6d6
| 364500 ||  || — || March 9, 2007 || Catalina || CSS || EOS || align=right | 2.5 km || 
|}

364501–364600 

|-bgcolor=#d6d6d6
| 364501 ||  || — || March 10, 2007 || Kitt Peak || Spacewatch || — || align=right | 2.5 km || 
|-id=502 bgcolor=#d6d6d6
| 364502 ||  || — || February 25, 2007 || Mount Lemmon || Mount Lemmon Survey || LIX || align=right | 3.0 km || 
|-id=503 bgcolor=#d6d6d6
| 364503 ||  || — || March 10, 2007 || Kitt Peak || Spacewatch || THM || align=right | 2.5 km || 
|-id=504 bgcolor=#d6d6d6
| 364504 ||  || — || March 10, 2007 || Kitt Peak || Spacewatch || — || align=right | 2.9 km || 
|-id=505 bgcolor=#d6d6d6
| 364505 ||  || — || March 10, 2007 || Kitt Peak || Spacewatch || EOS || align=right | 2.3 km || 
|-id=506 bgcolor=#d6d6d6
| 364506 ||  || — || March 10, 2007 || Kitt Peak || Spacewatch || — || align=right | 3.2 km || 
|-id=507 bgcolor=#d6d6d6
| 364507 ||  || — || March 9, 2007 || Kitt Peak || Spacewatch || 637 || align=right | 2.5 km || 
|-id=508 bgcolor=#d6d6d6
| 364508 ||  || — || February 21, 2007 || Mount Lemmon || Mount Lemmon Survey || — || align=right | 2.0 km || 
|-id=509 bgcolor=#d6d6d6
| 364509 ||  || — || March 10, 2007 || Mount Lemmon || Mount Lemmon Survey || — || align=right | 2.5 km || 
|-id=510 bgcolor=#d6d6d6
| 364510 ||  || — || March 10, 2007 || Mount Lemmon || Mount Lemmon Survey || — || align=right | 2.7 km || 
|-id=511 bgcolor=#d6d6d6
| 364511 ||  || — || March 11, 2007 || Kitt Peak || Spacewatch || — || align=right | 2.6 km || 
|-id=512 bgcolor=#d6d6d6
| 364512 ||  || — || February 23, 2007 || Mount Lemmon || Mount Lemmon Survey || THM || align=right | 2.2 km || 
|-id=513 bgcolor=#d6d6d6
| 364513 ||  || — || March 13, 2007 || Mount Lemmon || Mount Lemmon Survey || THM || align=right | 2.4 km || 
|-id=514 bgcolor=#d6d6d6
| 364514 ||  || — || March 9, 2007 || Mount Lemmon || Mount Lemmon Survey || — || align=right | 2.3 km || 
|-id=515 bgcolor=#d6d6d6
| 364515 ||  || — || February 23, 2007 || Kitt Peak || Spacewatch || — || align=right | 2.7 km || 
|-id=516 bgcolor=#d6d6d6
| 364516 ||  || — || February 26, 2007 || Mount Lemmon || Mount Lemmon Survey || — || align=right | 2.5 km || 
|-id=517 bgcolor=#d6d6d6
| 364517 ||  || — || March 12, 2007 || Mount Lemmon || Mount Lemmon Survey || THM || align=right | 2.2 km || 
|-id=518 bgcolor=#d6d6d6
| 364518 ||  || — || March 12, 2007 || Mount Lemmon || Mount Lemmon Survey || — || align=right | 2.8 km || 
|-id=519 bgcolor=#d6d6d6
| 364519 ||  || — || March 12, 2007 || Mount Lemmon || Mount Lemmon Survey || — || align=right | 2.6 km || 
|-id=520 bgcolor=#d6d6d6
| 364520 ||  || — || March 12, 2007 || Mount Lemmon || Mount Lemmon Survey || HYG || align=right | 4.5 km || 
|-id=521 bgcolor=#d6d6d6
| 364521 ||  || — || March 13, 2007 || Kitt Peak || Spacewatch || — || align=right | 4.0 km || 
|-id=522 bgcolor=#d6d6d6
| 364522 ||  || — || March 13, 2007 || Kitt Peak || Spacewatch || EOS || align=right | 1.9 km || 
|-id=523 bgcolor=#d6d6d6
| 364523 ||  || — || March 14, 2007 || Mount Lemmon || Mount Lemmon Survey || EUP || align=right | 3.9 km || 
|-id=524 bgcolor=#d6d6d6
| 364524 ||  || — || March 14, 2007 || Kitt Peak || Spacewatch || — || align=right | 3.2 km || 
|-id=525 bgcolor=#d6d6d6
| 364525 ||  || — || February 25, 2007 || Mount Lemmon || Mount Lemmon Survey || — || align=right | 2.8 km || 
|-id=526 bgcolor=#d6d6d6
| 364526 ||  || — || February 21, 2007 || Kitt Peak || Spacewatch || — || align=right | 3.2 km || 
|-id=527 bgcolor=#FA8072
| 364527 ||  || — || March 9, 2007 || Siding Spring || SSS || H || align=right | 1.1 km || 
|-id=528 bgcolor=#d6d6d6
| 364528 ||  || — || February 22, 2007 || Catalina || CSS || — || align=right | 3.8 km || 
|-id=529 bgcolor=#d6d6d6
| 364529 ||  || — || March 10, 2007 || Kitt Peak || Spacewatch || — || align=right | 2.8 km || 
|-id=530 bgcolor=#d6d6d6
| 364530 ||  || — || March 15, 2007 || Catalina || CSS || EUP || align=right | 3.8 km || 
|-id=531 bgcolor=#d6d6d6
| 364531 ||  || — || March 16, 2007 || Catalina || CSS || — || align=right | 4.3 km || 
|-id=532 bgcolor=#d6d6d6
| 364532 ||  || — || March 20, 2007 || Kitt Peak || Spacewatch || — || align=right | 2.7 km || 
|-id=533 bgcolor=#d6d6d6
| 364533 ||  || — || March 20, 2007 || Kitt Peak || Spacewatch || — || align=right | 3.0 km || 
|-id=534 bgcolor=#d6d6d6
| 364534 ||  || — || March 20, 2007 || Mount Lemmon || Mount Lemmon Survey || — || align=right | 2.4 km || 
|-id=535 bgcolor=#d6d6d6
| 364535 ||  || — || March 20, 2007 || Kitt Peak || Spacewatch || — || align=right | 2.3 km || 
|-id=536 bgcolor=#d6d6d6
| 364536 ||  || — || February 23, 2007 || Kitt Peak || Spacewatch || — || align=right | 2.9 km || 
|-id=537 bgcolor=#d6d6d6
| 364537 ||  || — || March 20, 2007 || Kitt Peak || Spacewatch || VER || align=right | 2.7 km || 
|-id=538 bgcolor=#d6d6d6
| 364538 ||  || — || March 20, 2007 || Anderson Mesa || LONEOS || Tj (2.91) || align=right | 3.7 km || 
|-id=539 bgcolor=#d6d6d6
| 364539 ||  || — || March 27, 2007 || Siding Spring || SSS || — || align=right | 4.8 km || 
|-id=540 bgcolor=#d6d6d6
| 364540 ||  || — || March 25, 2007 || Mount Lemmon || Mount Lemmon Survey || — || align=right | 4.0 km || 
|-id=541 bgcolor=#d6d6d6
| 364541 ||  || — || March 25, 2007 || Mount Lemmon || Mount Lemmon Survey || EOS || align=right | 2.8 km || 
|-id=542 bgcolor=#d6d6d6
| 364542 ||  || — || February 16, 2007 || Mount Lemmon || Mount Lemmon Survey || EOS || align=right | 2.0 km || 
|-id=543 bgcolor=#d6d6d6
| 364543 ||  || — || April 7, 2007 || Mount Lemmon || Mount Lemmon Survey || — || align=right | 3.3 km || 
|-id=544 bgcolor=#d6d6d6
| 364544 ||  || — || April 11, 2007 || 7300 Observatory || W. K. Y. Yeung || HYG || align=right | 2.9 km || 
|-id=545 bgcolor=#d6d6d6
| 364545 ||  || — || April 7, 2007 || Mount Lemmon || Mount Lemmon Survey || EMA || align=right | 4.2 km || 
|-id=546 bgcolor=#d6d6d6
| 364546 ||  || — || April 11, 2007 || Kitt Peak || Spacewatch || — || align=right | 3.3 km || 
|-id=547 bgcolor=#d6d6d6
| 364547 ||  || — || April 11, 2007 || Kitt Peak || Spacewatch || — || align=right | 3.7 km || 
|-id=548 bgcolor=#d6d6d6
| 364548 ||  || — || April 11, 2007 || Kitt Peak || Spacewatch || EUP || align=right | 4.3 km || 
|-id=549 bgcolor=#d6d6d6
| 364549 ||  || — || April 14, 2007 || Mount Lemmon || Mount Lemmon Survey || HYG || align=right | 2.8 km || 
|-id=550 bgcolor=#d6d6d6
| 364550 ||  || — || March 20, 2007 || Catalina || CSS || — || align=right | 3.2 km || 
|-id=551 bgcolor=#d6d6d6
| 364551 ||  || — || March 9, 2007 || Kitt Peak || Spacewatch || — || align=right | 3.4 km || 
|-id=552 bgcolor=#d6d6d6
| 364552 ||  || — || April 14, 2007 || Kitt Peak || Spacewatch || — || align=right | 3.1 km || 
|-id=553 bgcolor=#d6d6d6
| 364553 ||  || — || April 15, 2007 || Kitt Peak || Spacewatch || — || align=right | 3.3 km || 
|-id=554 bgcolor=#d6d6d6
| 364554 ||  || — || April 15, 2007 || Mount Lemmon || Mount Lemmon Survey || HYG || align=right | 2.8 km || 
|-id=555 bgcolor=#d6d6d6
| 364555 ||  || — || April 14, 2007 || Catalina || CSS || TIR || align=right | 3.7 km || 
|-id=556 bgcolor=#d6d6d6
| 364556 ||  || — || March 13, 2007 || Kitt Peak || Spacewatch || HYG || align=right | 2.2 km || 
|-id=557 bgcolor=#d6d6d6
| 364557 ||  || — || April 7, 2007 || Mount Lemmon || Mount Lemmon Survey || THM || align=right | 2.2 km || 
|-id=558 bgcolor=#d6d6d6
| 364558 ||  || — || April 19, 2007 || Mount Lemmon || Mount Lemmon Survey || — || align=right | 3.0 km || 
|-id=559 bgcolor=#d6d6d6
| 364559 ||  || — || April 16, 2007 || Mount Lemmon || Mount Lemmon Survey || HYG || align=right | 3.1 km || 
|-id=560 bgcolor=#d6d6d6
| 364560 ||  || — || April 16, 2007 || Socorro || LINEAR || EUP || align=right | 7.0 km || 
|-id=561 bgcolor=#d6d6d6
| 364561 ||  || — || April 19, 2007 || Mount Lemmon || Mount Lemmon Survey || — || align=right | 3.5 km || 
|-id=562 bgcolor=#d6d6d6
| 364562 ||  || — || March 14, 2007 || Mount Lemmon || Mount Lemmon Survey || VER || align=right | 2.7 km || 
|-id=563 bgcolor=#d6d6d6
| 364563 ||  || — || May 10, 2007 || Mount Lemmon || Mount Lemmon Survey || — || align=right | 3.3 km || 
|-id=564 bgcolor=#d6d6d6
| 364564 ||  || — || May 10, 2007 || Catalina || CSS || — || align=right | 3.8 km || 
|-id=565 bgcolor=#d6d6d6
| 364565 ||  || — || May 16, 2007 || Catalina || CSS || EUP || align=right | 4.3 km || 
|-id=566 bgcolor=#FA8072
| 364566 Yurga ||  ||  || August 10, 2007 || Nauchnij || V. Rumyantsev || — || align=right data-sort-value="0.63" | 630 m || 
|-id=567 bgcolor=#fefefe
| 364567 ||  || — || August 8, 2007 || Socorro || LINEAR || FLO || align=right data-sort-value="0.75" | 750 m || 
|-id=568 bgcolor=#fefefe
| 364568 ||  || — || August 9, 2007 || Socorro || LINEAR || — || align=right data-sort-value="0.91" | 910 m || 
|-id=569 bgcolor=#fefefe
| 364569 ||  || — || August 16, 2007 || Purple Mountain || PMO NEO || FLO || align=right data-sort-value="0.63" | 630 m || 
|-id=570 bgcolor=#fefefe
| 364570 ||  || — || August 16, 2007 || Purple Mountain || PMO NEO || — || align=right data-sort-value="0.75" | 750 m || 
|-id=571 bgcolor=#fefefe
| 364571 ||  || — || September 3, 2007 || Catalina || CSS || FLO || align=right data-sort-value="0.68" | 680 m || 
|-id=572 bgcolor=#fefefe
| 364572 ||  || — || September 10, 2007 || Dauban || Chante-Perdrix Obs. || — || align=right data-sort-value="0.88" | 880 m || 
|-id=573 bgcolor=#E9E9E9
| 364573 ||  || — || September 3, 2007 || Catalina || CSS || — || align=right data-sort-value="0.85" | 850 m || 
|-id=574 bgcolor=#fefefe
| 364574 ||  || — || August 12, 2007 || Socorro || LINEAR || — || align=right data-sort-value="0.67" | 670 m || 
|-id=575 bgcolor=#fefefe
| 364575 ||  || — || September 4, 2007 || Catalina || CSS || — || align=right data-sort-value="0.98" | 980 m || 
|-id=576 bgcolor=#fefefe
| 364576 ||  || — || September 5, 2007 || Catalina || CSS || FLO || align=right data-sort-value="0.89" | 890 m || 
|-id=577 bgcolor=#fefefe
| 364577 Cachopito ||  ||  || September 7, 2007 || La Cañada || J. Lacruz || V || align=right data-sort-value="0.68" | 680 m || 
|-id=578 bgcolor=#fefefe
| 364578 ||  || — || September 8, 2007 || Anderson Mesa || LONEOS || — || align=right | 1.2 km || 
|-id=579 bgcolor=#fefefe
| 364579 ||  || — || September 9, 2007 || Kitt Peak || Spacewatch || — || align=right data-sort-value="0.80" | 800 m || 
|-id=580 bgcolor=#fefefe
| 364580 ||  || — || September 9, 2007 || Kitt Peak || Spacewatch || V || align=right data-sort-value="0.56" | 560 m || 
|-id=581 bgcolor=#fefefe
| 364581 ||  || — || September 10, 2007 || Kitt Peak || Spacewatch || V || align=right data-sort-value="0.52" | 520 m || 
|-id=582 bgcolor=#fefefe
| 364582 ||  || — || September 11, 2007 || Catalina || CSS || V || align=right data-sort-value="0.79" | 790 m || 
|-id=583 bgcolor=#fefefe
| 364583 ||  || — || September 11, 2007 || Catalina || CSS || — || align=right data-sort-value="0.75" | 750 m || 
|-id=584 bgcolor=#fefefe
| 364584 ||  || — || September 11, 2007 || Kitt Peak || Spacewatch || FLO || align=right data-sort-value="0.76" | 760 m || 
|-id=585 bgcolor=#fefefe
| 364585 ||  || — || September 11, 2007 || Kitt Peak || Spacewatch || — || align=right data-sort-value="0.84" | 840 m || 
|-id=586 bgcolor=#fefefe
| 364586 ||  || — || September 11, 2007 || Purple Mountain || PMO NEO || FLO || align=right data-sort-value="0.60" | 600 m || 
|-id=587 bgcolor=#fefefe
| 364587 ||  || — || September 11, 2007 || Purple Mountain || PMO NEO || — || align=right data-sort-value="0.83" | 830 m || 
|-id=588 bgcolor=#fefefe
| 364588 ||  || — || September 12, 2007 || Anderson Mesa || LONEOS || — || align=right data-sort-value="0.93" | 930 m || 
|-id=589 bgcolor=#fefefe
| 364589 ||  || — || September 12, 2007 || Catalina || CSS || — || align=right | 1.2 km || 
|-id=590 bgcolor=#fefefe
| 364590 ||  || — || September 13, 2007 || Socorro || LINEAR || — || align=right data-sort-value="0.71" | 710 m || 
|-id=591 bgcolor=#fefefe
| 364591 ||  || — || September 14, 2007 || Socorro || LINEAR || FLO || align=right data-sort-value="0.68" | 680 m || 
|-id=592 bgcolor=#fefefe
| 364592 ||  || — || September 11, 2007 || Kitt Peak || Spacewatch || NYS || align=right data-sort-value="0.61" | 610 m || 
|-id=593 bgcolor=#fefefe
| 364593 ||  || — || September 9, 2007 || Kitt Peak || Spacewatch || FLO || align=right data-sort-value="0.67" | 670 m || 
|-id=594 bgcolor=#fefefe
| 364594 ||  || — || August 10, 2007 || Kitt Peak || Spacewatch || critical || align=right data-sort-value="0.57" | 570 m || 
|-id=595 bgcolor=#fefefe
| 364595 ||  || — || September 10, 2007 || Kitt Peak || Spacewatch || — || align=right data-sort-value="0.94" | 940 m || 
|-id=596 bgcolor=#fefefe
| 364596 ||  || — || September 10, 2007 || Mount Lemmon || Mount Lemmon Survey || — || align=right data-sort-value="0.62" | 620 m || 
|-id=597 bgcolor=#fefefe
| 364597 ||  || — || September 10, 2007 || Kitt Peak || Spacewatch || V || align=right data-sort-value="0.65" | 650 m || 
|-id=598 bgcolor=#fefefe
| 364598 ||  || — || December 15, 2004 || Kitt Peak || Spacewatch || V || align=right data-sort-value="0.64" | 640 m || 
|-id=599 bgcolor=#fefefe
| 364599 ||  || — || September 12, 2007 || Kitt Peak || Spacewatch || — || align=right data-sort-value="0.75" | 750 m || 
|-id=600 bgcolor=#fefefe
| 364600 ||  || — || September 13, 2007 || Kitt Peak || Spacewatch || — || align=right | 1.0 km || 
|}

364601–364700 

|-bgcolor=#fefefe
| 364601 ||  || — || September 10, 2007 || Mount Lemmon || Mount Lemmon Survey || FLO || align=right data-sort-value="0.63" | 630 m || 
|-id=602 bgcolor=#fefefe
| 364602 ||  || — || September 12, 2007 || Anderson Mesa || LONEOS || — || align=right data-sort-value="0.78" | 780 m || 
|-id=603 bgcolor=#fefefe
| 364603 ||  || — || September 10, 2007 || Kitt Peak || Spacewatch || — || align=right data-sort-value="0.70" | 700 m || 
|-id=604 bgcolor=#fefefe
| 364604 ||  || — || September 13, 2007 || Mount Lemmon || Mount Lemmon Survey || — || align=right data-sort-value="0.75" | 750 m || 
|-id=605 bgcolor=#fefefe
| 364605 ||  || — || September 13, 2007 || Kitt Peak || Spacewatch || — || align=right data-sort-value="0.83" | 830 m || 
|-id=606 bgcolor=#fefefe
| 364606 ||  || — || September 14, 2007 || Mount Lemmon || Mount Lemmon Survey || FLO || align=right data-sort-value="0.70" | 700 m || 
|-id=607 bgcolor=#fefefe
| 364607 ||  || — || September 15, 2007 || Kitt Peak || Spacewatch || FLO || align=right data-sort-value="0.62" | 620 m || 
|-id=608 bgcolor=#fefefe
| 364608 ||  || — || September 15, 2007 || Kitt Peak || Spacewatch || — || align=right data-sort-value="0.91" | 910 m || 
|-id=609 bgcolor=#fefefe
| 364609 ||  || — || September 15, 2007 || Kitt Peak || Spacewatch || NYS || align=right data-sort-value="0.61" | 610 m || 
|-id=610 bgcolor=#fefefe
| 364610 ||  || — || September 12, 2007 || Catalina || CSS || — || align=right data-sort-value="0.99" | 990 m || 
|-id=611 bgcolor=#fefefe
| 364611 ||  || — || September 13, 2007 || Mount Lemmon || Mount Lemmon Survey || V || align=right data-sort-value="0.70" | 700 m || 
|-id=612 bgcolor=#fefefe
| 364612 ||  || — || September 14, 2007 || Mount Lemmon || Mount Lemmon Survey || — || align=right data-sort-value="0.88" | 880 m || 
|-id=613 bgcolor=#fefefe
| 364613 ||  || — || September 13, 2007 || Mount Lemmon || Mount Lemmon Survey || — || align=right data-sort-value="0.72" | 720 m || 
|-id=614 bgcolor=#E9E9E9
| 364614 ||  || — || September 14, 2007 || Mount Lemmon || Mount Lemmon Survey || — || align=right | 1.4 km || 
|-id=615 bgcolor=#fefefe
| 364615 ||  || — || September 15, 2007 || Mount Lemmon || Mount Lemmon Survey || — || align=right data-sort-value="0.80" | 800 m || 
|-id=616 bgcolor=#fefefe
| 364616 ||  || — || September 19, 2007 || Majorca || OAM Obs. || FLO || align=right data-sort-value="0.68" | 680 m || 
|-id=617 bgcolor=#fefefe
| 364617 ||  || — || September 15, 2007 || Kitt Peak || Spacewatch || FLO || align=right data-sort-value="0.50" | 500 m || 
|-id=618 bgcolor=#fefefe
| 364618 ||  || — || September 30, 2007 || Kitt Peak || Spacewatch || — || align=right data-sort-value="0.89" | 890 m || 
|-id=619 bgcolor=#fefefe
| 364619 ||  || — || September 21, 2007 || XuYi || PMO NEO || — || align=right data-sort-value="0.84" | 840 m || 
|-id=620 bgcolor=#fefefe
| 364620 ||  || — || October 2, 2007 || Lulin Observatory || LUSS || V || align=right data-sort-value="0.71" | 710 m || 
|-id=621 bgcolor=#fefefe
| 364621 ||  || — || October 6, 2007 || Socorro || LINEAR || FLO || align=right data-sort-value="0.91" | 910 m || 
|-id=622 bgcolor=#fefefe
| 364622 ||  || — || October 6, 2007 || Socorro || LINEAR || FLO || align=right | 1.2 km || 
|-id=623 bgcolor=#fefefe
| 364623 ||  || — || October 7, 2007 || 7300 || W. K. Y. Yeung || V || align=right data-sort-value="0.68" | 680 m || 
|-id=624 bgcolor=#fefefe
| 364624 ||  || — || September 14, 2007 || Mount Lemmon || Mount Lemmon Survey || FLO || align=right data-sort-value="0.58" | 580 m || 
|-id=625 bgcolor=#fefefe
| 364625 ||  || — || October 4, 2007 || Goodricke-Pigott || R. A. Tucker || FLO || align=right data-sort-value="0.91" | 910 m || 
|-id=626 bgcolor=#fefefe
| 364626 ||  || — || October 6, 2007 || Kitt Peak || Spacewatch || V || align=right data-sort-value="0.83" | 830 m || 
|-id=627 bgcolor=#fefefe
| 364627 ||  || — || October 7, 2007 || Catalina || CSS || — || align=right data-sort-value="0.93" | 930 m || 
|-id=628 bgcolor=#fefefe
| 364628 ||  || — || September 25, 2007 || Mount Lemmon || Mount Lemmon Survey || — || align=right data-sort-value="0.76" | 760 m || 
|-id=629 bgcolor=#fefefe
| 364629 ||  || — || October 10, 2007 || Catalina || CSS || — || align=right | 1.6 km || 
|-id=630 bgcolor=#fefefe
| 364630 ||  || — || October 13, 2007 || Antares || ARO || — || align=right | 1.1 km || 
|-id=631 bgcolor=#fefefe
| 364631 ||  || — || October 8, 2007 || Mount Lemmon || Mount Lemmon Survey || — || align=right data-sort-value="0.66" | 660 m || 
|-id=632 bgcolor=#fefefe
| 364632 ||  || — || October 8, 2007 || Catalina || CSS || — || align=right data-sort-value="0.98" | 980 m || 
|-id=633 bgcolor=#fefefe
| 364633 ||  || — || October 8, 2007 || Mount Lemmon || Mount Lemmon Survey || — || align=right data-sort-value="0.67" | 670 m || 
|-id=634 bgcolor=#fefefe
| 364634 ||  || — || October 7, 2007 || Catalina || CSS || — || align=right data-sort-value="0.98" | 980 m || 
|-id=635 bgcolor=#fefefe
| 364635 ||  || — || October 8, 2007 || Kitt Peak || Spacewatch || — || align=right data-sort-value="0.96" | 960 m || 
|-id=636 bgcolor=#fefefe
| 364636 Ulrikeecker ||  ||  || October 15, 2007 || Redshed || H. Bachleitner || — || align=right data-sort-value="0.83" | 830 m || 
|-id=637 bgcolor=#E9E9E9
| 364637 ||  || — || October 4, 2007 || Kitt Peak || Spacewatch || — || align=right | 1.5 km || 
|-id=638 bgcolor=#fefefe
| 364638 ||  || — || October 4, 2007 || Kitt Peak || Spacewatch || — || align=right data-sort-value="0.97" | 970 m || 
|-id=639 bgcolor=#FA8072
| 364639 ||  || — || October 7, 2007 || Catalina || CSS || — || align=right data-sort-value="0.90" | 900 m || 
|-id=640 bgcolor=#fefefe
| 364640 ||  || — || October 8, 2007 || Catalina || CSS || V || align=right data-sort-value="0.89" | 890 m || 
|-id=641 bgcolor=#fefefe
| 364641 ||  || — || October 8, 2007 || Catalina || CSS || V || align=right data-sort-value="0.68" | 680 m || 
|-id=642 bgcolor=#fefefe
| 364642 ||  || — || October 5, 2007 || Kitt Peak || Spacewatch || — || align=right data-sort-value="0.71" | 710 m || 
|-id=643 bgcolor=#fefefe
| 364643 ||  || — || October 8, 2007 || Kitt Peak || Spacewatch || — || align=right data-sort-value="0.89" | 890 m || 
|-id=644 bgcolor=#fefefe
| 364644 ||  || — || October 6, 2007 || Socorro || LINEAR || FLO || align=right data-sort-value="0.80" | 800 m || 
|-id=645 bgcolor=#fefefe
| 364645 ||  || — || October 6, 2007 || Socorro || LINEAR || — || align=right data-sort-value="0.76" | 760 m || 
|-id=646 bgcolor=#fefefe
| 364646 ||  || — || October 8, 2007 || Socorro || LINEAR || MAS || align=right data-sort-value="0.65" | 650 m || 
|-id=647 bgcolor=#fefefe
| 364647 ||  || — || October 9, 2007 || Socorro || LINEAR || V || align=right data-sort-value="0.87" | 870 m || 
|-id=648 bgcolor=#fefefe
| 364648 ||  || — || October 9, 2007 || Socorro || LINEAR || — || align=right | 1.1 km || 
|-id=649 bgcolor=#fefefe
| 364649 ||  || — || October 9, 2007 || Socorro || LINEAR || NYS || align=right data-sort-value="0.77" | 770 m || 
|-id=650 bgcolor=#fefefe
| 364650 ||  || — || October 8, 2007 || Catalina || CSS || — || align=right | 1.2 km || 
|-id=651 bgcolor=#fefefe
| 364651 ||  || — || October 11, 2007 || Socorro || LINEAR || — || align=right data-sort-value="0.93" | 930 m || 
|-id=652 bgcolor=#fefefe
| 364652 ||  || — || October 11, 2007 || Socorro || LINEAR || NYS || align=right data-sort-value="0.70" | 700 m || 
|-id=653 bgcolor=#fefefe
| 364653 ||  || — || October 11, 2007 || Socorro || LINEAR || — || align=right | 1.1 km || 
|-id=654 bgcolor=#fefefe
| 364654 ||  || — || October 12, 2007 || Socorro || LINEAR || — || align=right | 1.2 km || 
|-id=655 bgcolor=#fefefe
| 364655 ||  || — || October 9, 2007 || Mount Lemmon || Mount Lemmon Survey || MAS || align=right data-sort-value="0.94" | 940 m || 
|-id=656 bgcolor=#fefefe
| 364656 ||  || — || September 5, 2007 || Mount Lemmon || Mount Lemmon Survey || — || align=right data-sort-value="0.90" | 900 m || 
|-id=657 bgcolor=#fefefe
| 364657 ||  || — || October 13, 2007 || Socorro || LINEAR || — || align=right data-sort-value="0.79" | 790 m || 
|-id=658 bgcolor=#fefefe
| 364658 ||  || — || October 7, 2007 || Catalina || CSS || — || align=right data-sort-value="0.69" | 690 m || 
|-id=659 bgcolor=#fefefe
| 364659 ||  || — || October 7, 2007 || Mount Lemmon || Mount Lemmon Survey || — || align=right data-sort-value="0.69" | 690 m || 
|-id=660 bgcolor=#fefefe
| 364660 ||  || — || October 11, 2007 || Mount Lemmon || Mount Lemmon Survey || — || align=right data-sort-value="0.83" | 830 m || 
|-id=661 bgcolor=#fefefe
| 364661 ||  || — || October 13, 2007 || Socorro || LINEAR || — || align=right data-sort-value="0.77" | 770 m || 
|-id=662 bgcolor=#fefefe
| 364662 ||  || — || October 10, 2007 || Mount Lemmon || Mount Lemmon Survey || — || align=right data-sort-value="0.59" | 590 m || 
|-id=663 bgcolor=#fefefe
| 364663 ||  || — || October 11, 2007 || Mount Lemmon || Mount Lemmon Survey || — || align=right | 1.1 km || 
|-id=664 bgcolor=#fefefe
| 364664 ||  || — || September 12, 2007 || Mount Lemmon || Mount Lemmon Survey || — || align=right data-sort-value="0.72" | 720 m || 
|-id=665 bgcolor=#fefefe
| 364665 ||  || — || October 11, 2007 || Catalina || CSS || — || align=right | 1.1 km || 
|-id=666 bgcolor=#E9E9E9
| 364666 ||  || — || October 9, 2007 || Mount Lemmon || Mount Lemmon Survey || — || align=right | 2.9 km || 
|-id=667 bgcolor=#fefefe
| 364667 ||  || — || October 11, 2007 || Mount Lemmon || Mount Lemmon Survey || — || align=right data-sort-value="0.99" | 990 m || 
|-id=668 bgcolor=#fefefe
| 364668 ||  || — || October 11, 2007 || Mount Lemmon || Mount Lemmon Survey || — || align=right data-sort-value="0.81" | 810 m || 
|-id=669 bgcolor=#fefefe
| 364669 ||  || — || October 12, 2007 || Kitt Peak || Spacewatch || — || align=right | 1.0 km || 
|-id=670 bgcolor=#fefefe
| 364670 ||  || — || October 13, 2007 || Catalina || CSS || FLO || align=right data-sort-value="0.58" | 580 m || 
|-id=671 bgcolor=#fefefe
| 364671 ||  || — || October 14, 2007 || Mount Lemmon || Mount Lemmon Survey || — || align=right data-sort-value="0.88" | 880 m || 
|-id=672 bgcolor=#fefefe
| 364672 ||  || — || October 10, 2007 || Kitt Peak || Spacewatch || V || align=right data-sort-value="0.81" | 810 m || 
|-id=673 bgcolor=#fefefe
| 364673 ||  || — || October 14, 2007 || Mount Lemmon || Mount Lemmon Survey || — || align=right | 1.0 km || 
|-id=674 bgcolor=#fefefe
| 364674 ||  || — || October 14, 2007 || Kitt Peak || Spacewatch || — || align=right data-sort-value="0.83" | 830 m || 
|-id=675 bgcolor=#fefefe
| 364675 ||  || — || October 14, 2007 || Kitt Peak || Spacewatch || FLO || align=right data-sort-value="0.76" | 760 m || 
|-id=676 bgcolor=#fefefe
| 364676 ||  || — || October 14, 2007 || Mount Lemmon || Mount Lemmon Survey || V || align=right data-sort-value="0.65" | 650 m || 
|-id=677 bgcolor=#fefefe
| 364677 ||  || — || October 14, 2007 || Mount Lemmon || Mount Lemmon Survey || V || align=right data-sort-value="0.79" | 790 m || 
|-id=678 bgcolor=#E9E9E9
| 364678 ||  || — || October 14, 2007 || Mount Lemmon || Mount Lemmon Survey || EUN || align=right | 1.3 km || 
|-id=679 bgcolor=#fefefe
| 364679 ||  || — || October 15, 2007 || Catalina || CSS || V || align=right data-sort-value="0.54" | 540 m || 
|-id=680 bgcolor=#fefefe
| 364680 ||  || — || October 9, 2007 || Kitt Peak || Spacewatch || — || align=right data-sort-value="0.88" | 880 m || 
|-id=681 bgcolor=#fefefe
| 364681 ||  || — || October 13, 2007 || Catalina || CSS || — || align=right data-sort-value="0.80" | 800 m || 
|-id=682 bgcolor=#E9E9E9
| 364682 ||  || — || October 10, 2007 || Catalina || CSS || — || align=right | 1.8 km || 
|-id=683 bgcolor=#fefefe
| 364683 ||  || — || September 12, 2007 || Catalina || CSS || — || align=right data-sort-value="0.93" | 930 m || 
|-id=684 bgcolor=#fefefe
| 364684 ||  || — || October 15, 2007 || Kitt Peak || Spacewatch || — || align=right | 1.0 km || 
|-id=685 bgcolor=#fefefe
| 364685 ||  || — || October 14, 2007 || Catalina || CSS || FLO || align=right data-sort-value="0.73" | 730 m || 
|-id=686 bgcolor=#fefefe
| 364686 ||  || — || October 7, 2007 || Catalina || CSS || V || align=right data-sort-value="0.86" | 860 m || 
|-id=687 bgcolor=#fefefe
| 364687 ||  || — || October 7, 2007 || Kitt Peak || Spacewatch || — || align=right data-sort-value="0.88" | 880 m || 
|-id=688 bgcolor=#fefefe
| 364688 ||  || — || October 13, 2007 || Mount Lemmon || Mount Lemmon Survey || — || align=right data-sort-value="0.77" | 770 m || 
|-id=689 bgcolor=#fefefe
| 364689 ||  || — || September 30, 2003 || Kitt Peak || Spacewatch || — || align=right data-sort-value="0.91" | 910 m || 
|-id=690 bgcolor=#fefefe
| 364690 ||  || — || October 18, 2007 || Mayhill || A. Lowe || FLO || align=right data-sort-value="0.80" | 800 m || 
|-id=691 bgcolor=#fefefe
| 364691 ||  || — || October 18, 2007 || Socorro || LINEAR || — || align=right data-sort-value="0.87" | 870 m || 
|-id=692 bgcolor=#fefefe
| 364692 ||  || — || October 16, 2007 || Kitt Peak || Spacewatch || FLO || align=right data-sort-value="0.66" | 660 m || 
|-id=693 bgcolor=#d6d6d6
| 364693 ||  || — || October 4, 2007 || XuYi || PMO NEO || 3:2 || align=right | 5.4 km || 
|-id=694 bgcolor=#fefefe
| 364694 ||  || — || October 19, 2007 || Kitt Peak || Spacewatch || — || align=right data-sort-value="0.88" | 880 m || 
|-id=695 bgcolor=#fefefe
| 364695 ||  || — || October 20, 2007 || Mount Lemmon || Mount Lemmon Survey || — || align=right data-sort-value="0.71" | 710 m || 
|-id=696 bgcolor=#fefefe
| 364696 ||  || — || October 20, 2007 || Mount Lemmon || Mount Lemmon Survey || — || align=right | 1.1 km || 
|-id=697 bgcolor=#fefefe
| 364697 ||  || — || October 24, 2007 || Mount Lemmon || Mount Lemmon Survey || V || align=right data-sort-value="0.77" | 770 m || 
|-id=698 bgcolor=#fefefe
| 364698 ||  || — || October 24, 2007 || Mount Lemmon || Mount Lemmon Survey || — || align=right | 1.0 km || 
|-id=699 bgcolor=#fefefe
| 364699 ||  || — || October 30, 2007 || Mount Lemmon || Mount Lemmon Survey || V || align=right data-sort-value="0.88" | 880 m || 
|-id=700 bgcolor=#E9E9E9
| 364700 ||  || — || October 30, 2007 || Mount Lemmon || Mount Lemmon Survey || — || align=right data-sort-value="0.90" | 900 m || 
|}

364701–364800 

|-bgcolor=#fefefe
| 364701 ||  || — || October 30, 2007 || Mount Lemmon || Mount Lemmon Survey || — || align=right data-sort-value="0.81" | 810 m || 
|-id=702 bgcolor=#fefefe
| 364702 ||  || — || October 30, 2007 || Catalina || CSS || — || align=right | 1.1 km || 
|-id=703 bgcolor=#E9E9E9
| 364703 ||  || — || October 20, 2007 || Mount Lemmon || Mount Lemmon Survey || — || align=right data-sort-value="0.71" | 710 m || 
|-id=704 bgcolor=#fefefe
| 364704 ||  || — || October 30, 2007 || Kitt Peak || Spacewatch || — || align=right data-sort-value="0.60" | 600 m || 
|-id=705 bgcolor=#fefefe
| 364705 ||  || — || October 30, 2007 || Mount Lemmon || Mount Lemmon Survey || — || align=right data-sort-value="0.60" | 600 m || 
|-id=706 bgcolor=#fefefe
| 364706 ||  || — || October 30, 2007 || Mount Lemmon || Mount Lemmon Survey || — || align=right data-sort-value="0.61" | 610 m || 
|-id=707 bgcolor=#fefefe
| 364707 ||  || — || October 30, 2007 || Kitt Peak || Spacewatch || — || align=right data-sort-value="0.75" | 750 m || 
|-id=708 bgcolor=#fefefe
| 364708 ||  || — || October 16, 2007 || Catalina || CSS || — || align=right data-sort-value="0.75" | 750 m || 
|-id=709 bgcolor=#E9E9E9
| 364709 ||  || — || September 12, 2007 || Mount Lemmon || Mount Lemmon Survey || — || align=right | 1.7 km || 
|-id=710 bgcolor=#fefefe
| 364710 ||  || — || November 3, 2007 || Kitami || K. Endate || — || align=right data-sort-value="0.91" | 910 m || 
|-id=711 bgcolor=#fefefe
| 364711 ||  || — || October 12, 2007 || Kitt Peak || Spacewatch || — || align=right data-sort-value="0.84" | 840 m || 
|-id=712 bgcolor=#fefefe
| 364712 ||  || — || November 1, 2007 || Kitt Peak || Spacewatch || — || align=right data-sort-value="0.85" | 850 m || 
|-id=713 bgcolor=#fefefe
| 364713 ||  || — || October 9, 2007 || Kitt Peak || Spacewatch || V || align=right data-sort-value="0.55" | 550 m || 
|-id=714 bgcolor=#fefefe
| 364714 ||  || — || November 1, 2007 || Kitt Peak || Spacewatch || — || align=right data-sort-value="0.73" | 730 m || 
|-id=715 bgcolor=#fefefe
| 364715 ||  || — || October 20, 2007 || Mount Lemmon || Mount Lemmon Survey || — || align=right | 1.1 km || 
|-id=716 bgcolor=#fefefe
| 364716 ||  || — || April 1, 2005 || Kitt Peak || Spacewatch || NYS || align=right data-sort-value="0.62" | 620 m || 
|-id=717 bgcolor=#fefefe
| 364717 ||  || — || November 1, 2007 || Kitt Peak || Spacewatch || V || align=right data-sort-value="0.80" | 800 m || 
|-id=718 bgcolor=#E9E9E9
| 364718 ||  || — || November 1, 2007 || Kitt Peak || Spacewatch || — || align=right data-sort-value="0.95" | 950 m || 
|-id=719 bgcolor=#fefefe
| 364719 ||  || — || November 1, 2007 || Kitt Peak || Spacewatch || — || align=right data-sort-value="0.71" | 710 m || 
|-id=720 bgcolor=#fefefe
| 364720 ||  || — || November 2, 2007 || Kitt Peak || Spacewatch || V || align=right data-sort-value="0.80" | 800 m || 
|-id=721 bgcolor=#E9E9E9
| 364721 ||  || — || November 2, 2007 || Kitt Peak || Spacewatch || — || align=right | 2.4 km || 
|-id=722 bgcolor=#fefefe
| 364722 ||  || — || November 3, 2007 || Kitt Peak || Spacewatch || — || align=right data-sort-value="0.94" | 940 m || 
|-id=723 bgcolor=#fefefe
| 364723 ||  || — || November 4, 2007 || Kitt Peak || Spacewatch || MAS || align=right data-sort-value="0.70" | 700 m || 
|-id=724 bgcolor=#fefefe
| 364724 ||  || — || October 10, 2007 || Mount Lemmon || Mount Lemmon Survey || — || align=right data-sort-value="0.89" | 890 m || 
|-id=725 bgcolor=#fefefe
| 364725 ||  || — || November 8, 2007 || Socorro || LINEAR || V || align=right data-sort-value="0.85" | 850 m || 
|-id=726 bgcolor=#E9E9E9
| 364726 ||  || — || November 2, 2007 || Kitt Peak || Spacewatch || — || align=right data-sort-value="0.87" | 870 m || 
|-id=727 bgcolor=#E9E9E9
| 364727 ||  || — || October 21, 2007 || Mount Lemmon || Mount Lemmon Survey || — || align=right | 1.3 km || 
|-id=728 bgcolor=#fefefe
| 364728 ||  || — || November 3, 2007 || Kitt Peak || Spacewatch || — || align=right data-sort-value="0.80" | 800 m || 
|-id=729 bgcolor=#fefefe
| 364729 ||  || — || November 3, 2007 || Kitt Peak || Spacewatch || — || align=right | 1.0 km || 
|-id=730 bgcolor=#fefefe
| 364730 ||  || — || November 3, 2007 || Kitt Peak || Spacewatch || V || align=right data-sort-value="0.79" | 790 m || 
|-id=731 bgcolor=#fefefe
| 364731 ||  || — || September 18, 2007 || Goodricke-Pigott || R. A. Tucker || NYS || align=right data-sort-value="0.69" | 690 m || 
|-id=732 bgcolor=#fefefe
| 364732 ||  || — || October 15, 2007 || Mount Lemmon || Mount Lemmon Survey || — || align=right data-sort-value="0.84" | 840 m || 
|-id=733 bgcolor=#fefefe
| 364733 ||  || — || November 5, 2007 || Purple Mountain || PMO NEO || MAS || align=right data-sort-value="0.86" | 860 m || 
|-id=734 bgcolor=#fefefe
| 364734 ||  || — || November 5, 2007 || Purple Mountain || PMO NEO || — || align=right | 1.1 km || 
|-id=735 bgcolor=#fefefe
| 364735 ||  || — || November 5, 2007 || Kitt Peak || Spacewatch || FLO || align=right data-sort-value="0.72" | 720 m || 
|-id=736 bgcolor=#fefefe
| 364736 ||  || — || November 7, 2007 || Mount Lemmon || Mount Lemmon Survey || V || align=right data-sort-value="0.76" | 760 m || 
|-id=737 bgcolor=#fefefe
| 364737 ||  || — || November 9, 2007 || Kitt Peak || Spacewatch || — || align=right data-sort-value="0.67" | 670 m || 
|-id=738 bgcolor=#fefefe
| 364738 ||  || — || November 9, 2007 || Kitt Peak || Spacewatch || — || align=right | 1.1 km || 
|-id=739 bgcolor=#fefefe
| 364739 ||  || — || November 9, 2007 || Kitt Peak || Spacewatch || V || align=right data-sort-value="0.75" | 750 m || 
|-id=740 bgcolor=#fefefe
| 364740 ||  || — || November 9, 2007 || Mount Lemmon || Mount Lemmon Survey || — || align=right data-sort-value="0.65" | 650 m || 
|-id=741 bgcolor=#fefefe
| 364741 ||  || — || November 13, 2007 || Mount Lemmon || Mount Lemmon Survey || V || align=right data-sort-value="0.68" | 680 m || 
|-id=742 bgcolor=#fefefe
| 364742 ||  || — || October 31, 2007 || Catalina || CSS || V || align=right data-sort-value="0.78" | 780 m || 
|-id=743 bgcolor=#fefefe
| 364743 ||  || — || November 13, 2007 || Catalina || CSS || PHO || align=right | 1.3 km || 
|-id=744 bgcolor=#fefefe
| 364744 ||  || — || November 11, 2007 || Socorro || LINEAR || V || align=right data-sort-value="0.81" | 810 m || 
|-id=745 bgcolor=#fefefe
| 364745 ||  || — || November 12, 2007 || Socorro || LINEAR || — || align=right data-sort-value="0.70" | 700 m || 
|-id=746 bgcolor=#fefefe
| 364746 ||  || — || November 14, 2007 || Socorro || LINEAR || — || align=right | 1.1 km || 
|-id=747 bgcolor=#fefefe
| 364747 ||  || — || November 13, 2007 || Mount Lemmon || Mount Lemmon Survey || V || align=right data-sort-value="0.68" | 680 m || 
|-id=748 bgcolor=#fefefe
| 364748 ||  || — || November 13, 2007 || Catalina || CSS || FLO || align=right | 1.3 km || 
|-id=749 bgcolor=#fefefe
| 364749 ||  || — || November 13, 2007 || Kitt Peak || Spacewatch || V || align=right data-sort-value="0.57" | 570 m || 
|-id=750 bgcolor=#E9E9E9
| 364750 ||  || — || November 15, 2007 || Catalina || CSS || — || align=right | 1.2 km || 
|-id=751 bgcolor=#fefefe
| 364751 ||  || — || November 2, 2007 || Kitt Peak || Spacewatch || V || align=right data-sort-value="0.95" | 950 m || 
|-id=752 bgcolor=#fefefe
| 364752 ||  || — || November 11, 2007 || Mount Lemmon || Mount Lemmon Survey || — || align=right data-sort-value="0.94" | 940 m || 
|-id=753 bgcolor=#fefefe
| 364753 ||  || — || November 7, 2007 || Socorro || LINEAR || — || align=right data-sort-value="0.88" | 880 m || 
|-id=754 bgcolor=#fefefe
| 364754 ||  || — || November 14, 2007 || Socorro || LINEAR || FLO || align=right data-sort-value="0.78" | 780 m || 
|-id=755 bgcolor=#E9E9E9
| 364755 ||  || — || November 12, 2007 || Mount Lemmon || Mount Lemmon Survey || — || align=right | 1.4 km || 
|-id=756 bgcolor=#fefefe
| 364756 ||  || — || November 16, 2007 || Dauban || Chante-Perdrix Obs. || MAS || align=right data-sort-value="0.67" | 670 m || 
|-id=757 bgcolor=#E9E9E9
| 364757 ||  || — || November 8, 2007 || Kitt Peak || Spacewatch || — || align=right | 1.4 km || 
|-id=758 bgcolor=#fefefe
| 364758 ||  || — || November 18, 2007 || Mount Lemmon || Mount Lemmon Survey || V || align=right data-sort-value="0.70" | 700 m || 
|-id=759 bgcolor=#E9E9E9
| 364759 ||  || — || November 18, 2007 || Mount Lemmon || Mount Lemmon Survey || — || align=right | 1.2 km || 
|-id=760 bgcolor=#E9E9E9
| 364760 ||  || — || November 18, 2007 || Mount Lemmon || Mount Lemmon Survey || RAF || align=right | 1.2 km || 
|-id=761 bgcolor=#fefefe
| 364761 ||  || — || November 18, 2007 || Socorro || LINEAR || — || align=right data-sort-value="0.99" | 990 m || 
|-id=762 bgcolor=#FFC2E0
| 364762 ||  || — || December 5, 2007 || Mount Lemmon || Mount Lemmon Survey || AMO || align=right | 1.0 km || 
|-id=763 bgcolor=#E9E9E9
| 364763 ||  || — || December 4, 2007 || Catalina || CSS || — || align=right data-sort-value="0.87" | 870 m || 
|-id=764 bgcolor=#E9E9E9
| 364764 ||  || — || December 10, 2007 || Socorro || LINEAR || — || align=right | 1.1 km || 
|-id=765 bgcolor=#fefefe
| 364765 ||  || — || December 10, 2007 || Socorro || LINEAR || NYS || align=right data-sort-value="0.76" | 760 m || 
|-id=766 bgcolor=#fefefe
| 364766 ||  || — || October 30, 2007 || Kitt Peak || Spacewatch || FLO || align=right data-sort-value="0.78" | 780 m || 
|-id=767 bgcolor=#E9E9E9
| 364767 ||  || — || November 11, 2007 || Mount Lemmon || Mount Lemmon Survey || — || align=right | 1.5 km || 
|-id=768 bgcolor=#fefefe
| 364768 ||  || — || December 15, 2007 || Mount Lemmon || Mount Lemmon Survey || V || align=right data-sort-value="0.68" | 680 m || 
|-id=769 bgcolor=#fefefe
| 364769 ||  || — || December 4, 2007 || Mount Lemmon || Mount Lemmon Survey || — || align=right data-sort-value="0.82" | 820 m || 
|-id=770 bgcolor=#E9E9E9
| 364770 ||  || — || December 4, 2007 || Socorro || LINEAR || ADE || align=right | 3.1 km || 
|-id=771 bgcolor=#E9E9E9
| 364771 ||  || — || December 5, 2007 || Kitt Peak || Spacewatch || — || align=right | 1.2 km || 
|-id=772 bgcolor=#E9E9E9
| 364772 ||  || — || December 5, 2007 || Kitt Peak || Spacewatch || — || align=right | 1.3 km || 
|-id=773 bgcolor=#E9E9E9
| 364773 || 2007 YT || — || December 16, 2007 || Bergisch Gladbach || W. Bickel || ADE || align=right | 2.1 km || 
|-id=774 bgcolor=#E9E9E9
| 364774 ||  || — || December 18, 2007 || Mount Lemmon || Mount Lemmon Survey || — || align=right | 2.4 km || 
|-id=775 bgcolor=#fefefe
| 364775 ||  || — || December 30, 2007 || Mount Lemmon || Mount Lemmon Survey || — || align=right data-sort-value="0.94" | 940 m || 
|-id=776 bgcolor=#E9E9E9
| 364776 ||  || — || December 30, 2007 || Kitt Peak || Spacewatch || — || align=right | 1.3 km || 
|-id=777 bgcolor=#E9E9E9
| 364777 ||  || — || December 31, 2007 || Catalina || CSS || BRG || align=right | 2.0 km || 
|-id=778 bgcolor=#E9E9E9
| 364778 ||  || — || December 18, 2007 || Mount Lemmon || Mount Lemmon Survey || — || align=right | 1.5 km || 
|-id=779 bgcolor=#fefefe
| 364779 ||  || — || December 30, 2007 || Mount Lemmon || Mount Lemmon Survey || MAS || align=right data-sort-value="0.93" | 930 m || 
|-id=780 bgcolor=#d6d6d6
| 364780 ||  || — || December 16, 2007 || Mount Lemmon || Mount Lemmon Survey || THB || align=right | 2.8 km || 
|-id=781 bgcolor=#E9E9E9
| 364781 ||  || — || January 7, 2008 || Lulin || LUSS || — || align=right | 1.1 km || 
|-id=782 bgcolor=#E9E9E9
| 364782 ||  || — || November 8, 2007 || Mount Lemmon || Mount Lemmon Survey || — || align=right | 1.2 km || 
|-id=783 bgcolor=#E9E9E9
| 364783 ||  || — || January 9, 2008 || Lulin || LUSS || — || align=right | 1.7 km || 
|-id=784 bgcolor=#fefefe
| 364784 ||  || — || January 10, 2008 || Mount Lemmon || Mount Lemmon Survey || V || align=right data-sort-value="0.81" | 810 m || 
|-id=785 bgcolor=#E9E9E9
| 364785 ||  || — || January 10, 2008 || Mount Lemmon || Mount Lemmon Survey || — || align=right | 1.5 km || 
|-id=786 bgcolor=#E9E9E9
| 364786 ||  || — || January 10, 2008 || Socorro || LINEAR || — || align=right | 1.2 km || 
|-id=787 bgcolor=#E9E9E9
| 364787 ||  || — || December 15, 2007 || Catalina || CSS || CLO || align=right | 1.7 km || 
|-id=788 bgcolor=#E9E9E9
| 364788 ||  || — || January 10, 2008 || Kitt Peak || Spacewatch || AEO || align=right | 1.0 km || 
|-id=789 bgcolor=#E9E9E9
| 364789 ||  || — || October 19, 2007 || Mount Lemmon || Mount Lemmon Survey || — || align=right | 1.3 km || 
|-id=790 bgcolor=#E9E9E9
| 364790 ||  || — || November 21, 2007 || Mount Lemmon || Mount Lemmon Survey || — || align=right | 1.5 km || 
|-id=791 bgcolor=#E9E9E9
| 364791 ||  || — || January 10, 2008 || Catalina || CSS || — || align=right | 3.3 km || 
|-id=792 bgcolor=#E9E9E9
| 364792 ||  || — || January 12, 2008 || Kitt Peak || Spacewatch || — || align=right data-sort-value="0.98" | 980 m || 
|-id=793 bgcolor=#E9E9E9
| 364793 ||  || — || January 12, 2008 || Kitt Peak || Spacewatch || — || align=right | 1.6 km || 
|-id=794 bgcolor=#fefefe
| 364794 ||  || — || January 13, 2008 || Kitt Peak || Spacewatch || NYS || align=right data-sort-value="0.82" | 820 m || 
|-id=795 bgcolor=#E9E9E9
| 364795 ||  || — || January 14, 2008 || Kitt Peak || Spacewatch || — || align=right data-sort-value="0.97" | 970 m || 
|-id=796 bgcolor=#E9E9E9
| 364796 ||  || — || December 31, 2007 || Kitt Peak || Spacewatch || — || align=right | 1.0 km || 
|-id=797 bgcolor=#E9E9E9
| 364797 ||  || — || January 14, 2008 || Kitt Peak || Spacewatch || — || align=right | 1.5 km || 
|-id=798 bgcolor=#E9E9E9
| 364798 ||  || — || January 14, 2008 || Kitt Peak || Spacewatch || — || align=right | 1.6 km || 
|-id=799 bgcolor=#E9E9E9
| 364799 ||  || — || January 15, 2008 || Kitt Peak || Spacewatch || — || align=right | 1.3 km || 
|-id=800 bgcolor=#E9E9E9
| 364800 ||  || — || January 11, 2008 || Kitt Peak || Spacewatch || — || align=right | 1.5 km || 
|}

364801–364900 

|-bgcolor=#E9E9E9
| 364801 ||  || — || January 11, 2008 || Kitt Peak || Spacewatch || HEN || align=right data-sort-value="0.81" | 810 m || 
|-id=802 bgcolor=#E9E9E9
| 364802 ||  || — || January 3, 2008 || Lulin || LUSS || — || align=right | 1.2 km || 
|-id=803 bgcolor=#E9E9E9
| 364803 ||  || — || January 11, 2008 || Mount Lemmon || Mount Lemmon Survey || XIZ || align=right | 1.8 km || 
|-id=804 bgcolor=#E9E9E9
| 364804 ||  || — || January 12, 2008 || Catalina || CSS || IAN || align=right data-sort-value="0.86" | 860 m || 
|-id=805 bgcolor=#E9E9E9
| 364805 ||  || — || January 16, 2008 || Kitt Peak || Spacewatch || ADE || align=right | 2.0 km || 
|-id=806 bgcolor=#E9E9E9
| 364806 ||  || — || June 30, 2005 || Kitt Peak || Spacewatch || — || align=right | 2.1 km || 
|-id=807 bgcolor=#E9E9E9
| 364807 ||  || — || January 19, 2008 || Mount Lemmon || Mount Lemmon Survey || — || align=right | 1.5 km || 
|-id=808 bgcolor=#E9E9E9
| 364808 ||  || — || January 28, 2008 || Lulin || LUSS || — || align=right | 1.7 km || 
|-id=809 bgcolor=#E9E9E9
| 364809 ||  || — || January 30, 2008 || Catalina || CSS || — || align=right | 3.0 km || 
|-id=810 bgcolor=#d6d6d6
| 364810 ||  || — || January 30, 2008 || Mount Lemmon || Mount Lemmon Survey || EUP || align=right | 4.7 km || 
|-id=811 bgcolor=#E9E9E9
| 364811 ||  || — || January 30, 2008 || Kitt Peak || Spacewatch || — || align=right | 1.3 km || 
|-id=812 bgcolor=#E9E9E9
| 364812 ||  || — || January 30, 2008 || Catalina || CSS || — || align=right | 1.7 km || 
|-id=813 bgcolor=#E9E9E9
| 364813 ||  || — || January 30, 2008 || Kitt Peak || Spacewatch || — || align=right | 2.3 km || 
|-id=814 bgcolor=#E9E9E9
| 364814 ||  || — || January 31, 2008 || La Sagra || OAM Obs. || — || align=right | 1.8 km || 
|-id=815 bgcolor=#E9E9E9
| 364815 ||  || — || January 30, 2008 || Catalina || CSS || — || align=right | 1.9 km || 
|-id=816 bgcolor=#E9E9E9
| 364816 ||  || — || January 30, 2008 || Mount Lemmon || Mount Lemmon Survey || — || align=right | 1.5 km || 
|-id=817 bgcolor=#E9E9E9
| 364817 ||  || — || November 14, 2007 || Mount Lemmon || Mount Lemmon Survey || — || align=right | 1.1 km || 
|-id=818 bgcolor=#E9E9E9
| 364818 ||  || — || February 1, 2008 || Kitami || K. Endate || — || align=right | 3.1 km || 
|-id=819 bgcolor=#E9E9E9
| 364819 ||  || — || February 2, 2008 || Wrightwood || J. W. Young || — || align=right | 2.5 km || 
|-id=820 bgcolor=#E9E9E9
| 364820 ||  || — || December 31, 2007 || Mount Lemmon || Mount Lemmon Survey || — || align=right | 1.2 km || 
|-id=821 bgcolor=#E9E9E9
| 364821 ||  || — || December 20, 2007 || Mount Lemmon || Mount Lemmon Survey || — || align=right | 1.7 km || 
|-id=822 bgcolor=#E9E9E9
| 364822 ||  || — || February 3, 2008 || Kitt Peak || Spacewatch || — || align=right | 1.6 km || 
|-id=823 bgcolor=#E9E9E9
| 364823 ||  || — || November 11, 2007 || Mount Lemmon || Mount Lemmon Survey || DOR || align=right | 2.9 km || 
|-id=824 bgcolor=#E9E9E9
| 364824 ||  || — || February 3, 2008 || Kitt Peak || Spacewatch || — || align=right | 1.4 km || 
|-id=825 bgcolor=#E9E9E9
| 364825 ||  || — || February 6, 2008 || Catalina || CSS || — || align=right | 1.6 km || 
|-id=826 bgcolor=#E9E9E9
| 364826 ||  || — || February 2, 2008 || Kitt Peak || Spacewatch || — || align=right | 1.2 km || 
|-id=827 bgcolor=#E9E9E9
| 364827 ||  || — || January 18, 2008 || Mount Lemmon || Mount Lemmon Survey || — || align=right | 1.3 km || 
|-id=828 bgcolor=#E9E9E9
| 364828 ||  || — || February 7, 2008 || Mount Lemmon || Mount Lemmon Survey || — || align=right | 2.0 km || 
|-id=829 bgcolor=#E9E9E9
| 364829 ||  || — || February 6, 2008 || Catalina || CSS || — || align=right | 1.4 km || 
|-id=830 bgcolor=#E9E9E9
| 364830 ||  || — || February 6, 2008 || Catalina || CSS || — || align=right | 2.4 km || 
|-id=831 bgcolor=#E9E9E9
| 364831 ||  || — || February 8, 2008 || Kitt Peak || Spacewatch || HEN || align=right data-sort-value="0.99" | 990 m || 
|-id=832 bgcolor=#E9E9E9
| 364832 ||  || — || February 2, 2008 || Kitt Peak || Spacewatch || — || align=right | 1.9 km || 
|-id=833 bgcolor=#E9E9E9
| 364833 ||  || — || February 10, 2008 || Kitt Peak || Spacewatch || — || align=right | 2.1 km || 
|-id=834 bgcolor=#E9E9E9
| 364834 ||  || — || February 8, 2008 || Bergisch Gladbac || W. Bickel || — || align=right | 2.2 km || 
|-id=835 bgcolor=#E9E9E9
| 364835 ||  || — || February 6, 2008 || Catalina || CSS || — || align=right | 2.3 km || 
|-id=836 bgcolor=#E9E9E9
| 364836 ||  || — || February 7, 2008 || Mount Lemmon || Mount Lemmon Survey || — || align=right | 1.4 km || 
|-id=837 bgcolor=#E9E9E9
| 364837 ||  || — || February 8, 2008 || Kitt Peak || Spacewatch || — || align=right | 1.5 km || 
|-id=838 bgcolor=#E9E9E9
| 364838 ||  || — || February 8, 2008 || Kitt Peak || Spacewatch || WIT || align=right data-sort-value="0.92" | 920 m || 
|-id=839 bgcolor=#E9E9E9
| 364839 ||  || — || February 8, 2008 || Kitt Peak || Spacewatch || — || align=right | 1.6 km || 
|-id=840 bgcolor=#E9E9E9
| 364840 ||  || — || February 8, 2008 || Kitt Peak || Spacewatch || — || align=right | 2.2 km || 
|-id=841 bgcolor=#E9E9E9
| 364841 ||  || — || February 8, 2008 || Kitt Peak || Spacewatch || — || align=right | 1.7 km || 
|-id=842 bgcolor=#E9E9E9
| 364842 ||  || — || December 14, 2007 || Mount Lemmon || Mount Lemmon Survey || ADE || align=right | 2.3 km || 
|-id=843 bgcolor=#E9E9E9
| 364843 ||  || — || February 9, 2008 || Catalina || CSS || — || align=right | 1.7 km || 
|-id=844 bgcolor=#E9E9E9
| 364844 ||  || — || February 9, 2008 || Catalina || CSS || — || align=right | 2.3 km || 
|-id=845 bgcolor=#E9E9E9
| 364845 ||  || — || February 12, 2008 || Kitt Peak || Spacewatch || — || align=right | 2.0 km || 
|-id=846 bgcolor=#E9E9E9
| 364846 ||  || — || February 14, 2008 || Siding Spring || SSS || BRU || align=right | 3.1 km || 
|-id=847 bgcolor=#d6d6d6
| 364847 ||  || — || February 13, 2008 || Mount Lemmon || Mount Lemmon Survey || — || align=right | 2.6 km || 
|-id=848 bgcolor=#d6d6d6
| 364848 ||  || — || February 8, 2008 || Kitt Peak || Spacewatch || TIR || align=right | 3.4 km || 
|-id=849 bgcolor=#E9E9E9
| 364849 ||  || — || February 12, 2008 || Mount Lemmon || Mount Lemmon Survey || — || align=right | 2.4 km || 
|-id=850 bgcolor=#E9E9E9
| 364850 ||  || — || February 2, 2008 || Mount Lemmon || Mount Lemmon Survey || — || align=right | 1.4 km || 
|-id=851 bgcolor=#E9E9E9
| 364851 ||  || — || February 8, 2008 || Kitt Peak || Spacewatch || — || align=right | 1.2 km || 
|-id=852 bgcolor=#d6d6d6
| 364852 ||  || — || February 3, 2008 || Catalina || CSS || — || align=right | 5.2 km || 
|-id=853 bgcolor=#E9E9E9
| 364853 ||  || — || February 7, 2008 || Mount Lemmon || Mount Lemmon Survey || — || align=right | 3.1 km || 
|-id=854 bgcolor=#E9E9E9
| 364854 ||  || — || February 24, 2008 || Mount Lemmon || Mount Lemmon Survey || — || align=right | 1.3 km || 
|-id=855 bgcolor=#E9E9E9
| 364855 ||  || — || February 10, 2008 || Kitt Peak || Spacewatch || — || align=right | 1.9 km || 
|-id=856 bgcolor=#E9E9E9
| 364856 ||  || — || November 18, 2007 || Mount Lemmon || Mount Lemmon Survey || — || align=right | 1.4 km || 
|-id=857 bgcolor=#E9E9E9
| 364857 ||  || — || February 26, 2008 || Kitt Peak || Spacewatch || — || align=right | 1.7 km || 
|-id=858 bgcolor=#E9E9E9
| 364858 ||  || — || February 27, 2008 || Catalina || CSS || — || align=right | 2.0 km || 
|-id=859 bgcolor=#E9E9E9
| 364859 ||  || — || February 27, 2008 || Kitt Peak || Spacewatch || — || align=right | 2.4 km || 
|-id=860 bgcolor=#E9E9E9
| 364860 ||  || — || February 26, 2008 || Mount Lemmon || Mount Lemmon Survey || PAD || align=right | 2.8 km || 
|-id=861 bgcolor=#E9E9E9
| 364861 ||  || — || February 28, 2008 || Catalina || CSS || JUN || align=right | 1.3 km || 
|-id=862 bgcolor=#E9E9E9
| 364862 ||  || — || February 26, 2008 || Mount Lemmon || Mount Lemmon Survey || MIS || align=right | 2.5 km || 
|-id=863 bgcolor=#E9E9E9
| 364863 ||  || — || February 27, 2008 || Kitt Peak || Spacewatch || BRU || align=right | 3.1 km || 
|-id=864 bgcolor=#E9E9E9
| 364864 ||  || — || February 27, 2008 || Kitt Peak || Spacewatch || — || align=right | 2.2 km || 
|-id=865 bgcolor=#E9E9E9
| 364865 ||  || — || February 27, 2008 || Mount Lemmon || Mount Lemmon Survey || — || align=right | 2.3 km || 
|-id=866 bgcolor=#d6d6d6
| 364866 ||  || — || February 29, 2008 || Catalina || CSS || EUP || align=right | 5.0 km || 
|-id=867 bgcolor=#E9E9E9
| 364867 ||  || — || February 29, 2008 || Mount Lemmon || Mount Lemmon Survey || MAR || align=right | 1.3 km || 
|-id=868 bgcolor=#E9E9E9
| 364868 ||  || — || February 29, 2008 || Mount Lemmon || Mount Lemmon Survey || — || align=right | 1.8 km || 
|-id=869 bgcolor=#E9E9E9
| 364869 ||  || — || November 17, 2007 || Kitt Peak || Spacewatch || MAR || align=right | 1.3 km || 
|-id=870 bgcolor=#E9E9E9
| 364870 ||  || — || February 28, 2008 || Catalina || CSS || — || align=right | 3.5 km || 
|-id=871 bgcolor=#E9E9E9
| 364871 ||  || — || February 28, 2008 || Mount Lemmon || Mount Lemmon Survey || — || align=right | 1.3 km || 
|-id=872 bgcolor=#E9E9E9
| 364872 ||  || — || February 18, 2008 || Catalina || CSS || — || align=right | 3.0 km || 
|-id=873 bgcolor=#E9E9E9
| 364873 ||  || — || February 28, 2008 || Mount Lemmon || Mount Lemmon Survey || — || align=right | 1.2 km || 
|-id=874 bgcolor=#d6d6d6
| 364874 ||  || — || February 27, 2008 || Kitt Peak || Spacewatch || — || align=right | 3.2 km || 
|-id=875 bgcolor=#E9E9E9
| 364875 Hualookeng ||  ||  || February 29, 2008 || XuYi || PMO NEO || — || align=right | 1.8 km || 
|-id=876 bgcolor=#E9E9E9
| 364876 ||  || — || February 29, 2008 || XuYi || PMO NEO || DOR || align=right | 2.6 km || 
|-id=877 bgcolor=#FFC2E0
| 364877 ||  || — || March 9, 2008 || Siding Spring || SSS || APO +1km || align=right data-sort-value="0.79" | 790 m || 
|-id=878 bgcolor=#E9E9E9
| 364878 ||  || — || March 1, 2008 || Kitt Peak || Spacewatch || — || align=right | 2.7 km || 
|-id=879 bgcolor=#E9E9E9
| 364879 ||  || — || March 3, 2008 || XuYi || PMO NEO || — || align=right | 2.8 km || 
|-id=880 bgcolor=#E9E9E9
| 364880 ||  || — || March 4, 2008 || Mount Lemmon || Mount Lemmon Survey || — || align=right | 2.4 km || 
|-id=881 bgcolor=#E9E9E9
| 364881 ||  || — || November 16, 2006 || Kitt Peak || Spacewatch || HEN || align=right | 1.4 km || 
|-id=882 bgcolor=#E9E9E9
| 364882 ||  || — || March 1, 2008 || Kitt Peak || Spacewatch || — || align=right | 2.5 km || 
|-id=883 bgcolor=#E9E9E9
| 364883 ||  || — || February 10, 2008 || Kitt Peak || Spacewatch || NEM || align=right | 2.1 km || 
|-id=884 bgcolor=#E9E9E9
| 364884 ||  || — || September 18, 2006 || Catalina || CSS || — || align=right | 2.0 km || 
|-id=885 bgcolor=#E9E9E9
| 364885 ||  || — || March 4, 2008 || Mount Lemmon || Mount Lemmon Survey || — || align=right | 1.9 km || 
|-id=886 bgcolor=#d6d6d6
| 364886 ||  || — || March 6, 2008 || Kitt Peak || Spacewatch || — || align=right | 2.7 km || 
|-id=887 bgcolor=#E9E9E9
| 364887 ||  || — || February 18, 2008 || Mount Lemmon || Mount Lemmon Survey || — || align=right | 2.3 km || 
|-id=888 bgcolor=#E9E9E9
| 364888 ||  || — || February 18, 2008 || Mount Lemmon || Mount Lemmon Survey || — || align=right | 2.1 km || 
|-id=889 bgcolor=#E9E9E9
| 364889 ||  || — || March 7, 2008 || Kitt Peak || Spacewatch || GEF || align=right | 1.6 km || 
|-id=890 bgcolor=#d6d6d6
| 364890 ||  || — || March 9, 2008 || Mount Lemmon || Mount Lemmon Survey || EOS || align=right | 1.9 km || 
|-id=891 bgcolor=#E9E9E9
| 364891 ||  || — || March 9, 2008 || Mount Lemmon || Mount Lemmon Survey || — || align=right | 1.6 km || 
|-id=892 bgcolor=#E9E9E9
| 364892 ||  || — || March 4, 2008 || Mount Lemmon || Mount Lemmon Survey || TIN || align=right | 1.6 km || 
|-id=893 bgcolor=#E9E9E9
| 364893 ||  || — || March 6, 2008 || Mount Lemmon || Mount Lemmon Survey || NEM || align=right | 2.3 km || 
|-id=894 bgcolor=#E9E9E9
| 364894 ||  || — || March 7, 2008 || Kitt Peak || Spacewatch || MRX || align=right | 1.1 km || 
|-id=895 bgcolor=#E9E9E9
| 364895 ||  || — || March 7, 2008 || Kitt Peak || Spacewatch || — || align=right | 3.0 km || 
|-id=896 bgcolor=#E9E9E9
| 364896 ||  || — || March 8, 2008 || Mount Lemmon || Mount Lemmon Survey || HNA || align=right | 2.6 km || 
|-id=897 bgcolor=#E9E9E9
| 364897 ||  || — || March 9, 2008 || Mount Lemmon || Mount Lemmon Survey || ADE || align=right | 2.2 km || 
|-id=898 bgcolor=#E9E9E9
| 364898 ||  || — || March 7, 2008 || Catalina || CSS || AEO || align=right | 1.4 km || 
|-id=899 bgcolor=#E9E9E9
| 364899 ||  || — || March 6, 2008 || Mount Lemmon || Mount Lemmon Survey || — || align=right | 1.3 km || 
|-id=900 bgcolor=#E9E9E9
| 364900 ||  || — || March 6, 2008 || Mount Lemmon || Mount Lemmon Survey || WIT || align=right data-sort-value="0.93" | 930 m || 
|}

364901–365000 

|-bgcolor=#E9E9E9
| 364901 ||  || — || March 1, 2008 || Kitt Peak || Spacewatch || HOF || align=right | 2.8 km || 
|-id=902 bgcolor=#E9E9E9
| 364902 ||  || — || March 9, 2008 || Kitt Peak || Spacewatch || — || align=right | 1.6 km || 
|-id=903 bgcolor=#d6d6d6
| 364903 ||  || — || March 9, 2008 || Kitt Peak || Spacewatch || — || align=right | 1.8 km || 
|-id=904 bgcolor=#E9E9E9
| 364904 ||  || — || March 11, 2008 || Kitt Peak || Spacewatch || HNA || align=right | 2.4 km || 
|-id=905 bgcolor=#E9E9E9
| 364905 ||  || — || October 7, 2005 || Catalina || CSS || MRX || align=right | 1.2 km || 
|-id=906 bgcolor=#E9E9E9
| 364906 ||  || — || March 11, 2008 || Kitt Peak || Spacewatch || — || align=right | 2.4 km || 
|-id=907 bgcolor=#E9E9E9
| 364907 ||  || — || March 11, 2008 || Kitt Peak || Spacewatch || — || align=right | 1.8 km || 
|-id=908 bgcolor=#E9E9E9
| 364908 ||  || — || March 11, 2008 || Kitt Peak || Spacewatch || — || align=right | 2.2 km || 
|-id=909 bgcolor=#E9E9E9
| 364909 ||  || — || March 12, 2008 || Kitt Peak || Spacewatch || — || align=right | 2.1 km || 
|-id=910 bgcolor=#E9E9E9
| 364910 ||  || — || March 7, 2008 || Nyukasa || Mount Nyukasa Stn. || — || align=right | 2.3 km || 
|-id=911 bgcolor=#E9E9E9
| 364911 ||  || — || March 2, 2008 || Kitt Peak || Spacewatch || — || align=right | 1.8 km || 
|-id=912 bgcolor=#E9E9E9
| 364912 ||  || — || March 4, 2008 || Mount Lemmon || Mount Lemmon Survey || — || align=right | 2.1 km || 
|-id=913 bgcolor=#d6d6d6
| 364913 ||  || — || March 10, 2008 || Kitt Peak || Spacewatch || K-2 || align=right | 1.3 km || 
|-id=914 bgcolor=#E9E9E9
| 364914 ||  || — || March 11, 2008 || Mount Lemmon || Mount Lemmon Survey || GEF || align=right | 1.4 km || 
|-id=915 bgcolor=#E9E9E9
| 364915 ||  || — || March 15, 2008 || Mount Lemmon || Mount Lemmon Survey || — || align=right | 2.0 km || 
|-id=916 bgcolor=#E9E9E9
| 364916 ||  || — || March 13, 2008 || Mount Lemmon || Mount Lemmon Survey || — || align=right | 1.6 km || 
|-id=917 bgcolor=#E9E9E9
| 364917 ||  || — || March 10, 2008 || Kitt Peak || Spacewatch || — || align=right | 2.3 km || 
|-id=918 bgcolor=#E9E9E9
| 364918 ||  || — || May 19, 2004 || Campo Imperatore || CINEOS || — || align=right | 2.8 km || 
|-id=919 bgcolor=#E9E9E9
| 364919 ||  || — || March 2, 2008 || Kitt Peak || Spacewatch || — || align=right | 2.3 km || 
|-id=920 bgcolor=#E9E9E9
| 364920 ||  || — || March 5, 2008 || Mount Lemmon || Mount Lemmon Survey || WIT || align=right | 1.1 km || 
|-id=921 bgcolor=#E9E9E9
| 364921 ||  || — || March 10, 2008 || Kitt Peak || Spacewatch || — || align=right | 2.3 km || 
|-id=922 bgcolor=#E9E9E9
| 364922 ||  || — || February 28, 2008 || Kitt Peak || Spacewatch || — || align=right | 1.9 km || 
|-id=923 bgcolor=#E9E9E9
| 364923 ||  || — || March 25, 2008 || Kitt Peak || Spacewatch || — || align=right | 2.3 km || 
|-id=924 bgcolor=#E9E9E9
| 364924 ||  || — || March 26, 2008 || Kitt Peak || Spacewatch || — || align=right | 2.0 km || 
|-id=925 bgcolor=#d6d6d6
| 364925 ||  || — || March 26, 2008 || Mount Lemmon || Mount Lemmon Survey || EOS || align=right | 1.7 km || 
|-id=926 bgcolor=#E9E9E9
| 364926 ||  || — || March 27, 2008 || Kitt Peak || Spacewatch || — || align=right | 2.3 km || 
|-id=927 bgcolor=#E9E9E9
| 364927 ||  || — || March 27, 2008 || Kitt Peak || Spacewatch || — || align=right | 2.3 km || 
|-id=928 bgcolor=#E9E9E9
| 364928 ||  || — || March 28, 2008 || Mount Lemmon || Mount Lemmon Survey || PAD || align=right | 1.4 km || 
|-id=929 bgcolor=#E9E9E9
| 364929 ||  || — || March 28, 2008 || Mount Lemmon || Mount Lemmon Survey || — || align=right | 1.9 km || 
|-id=930 bgcolor=#d6d6d6
| 364930 ||  || — || March 28, 2008 || Mount Lemmon || Mount Lemmon Survey || KOR || align=right | 1.2 km || 
|-id=931 bgcolor=#E9E9E9
| 364931 ||  || — || March 28, 2008 || Kitt Peak || Spacewatch || — || align=right | 2.2 km || 
|-id=932 bgcolor=#d6d6d6
| 364932 ||  || — || March 28, 2008 || Mount Lemmon || Mount Lemmon Survey || — || align=right | 2.2 km || 
|-id=933 bgcolor=#d6d6d6
| 364933 ||  || — || March 30, 2008 || Kitt Peak || Spacewatch || — || align=right | 4.2 km || 
|-id=934 bgcolor=#E9E9E9
| 364934 ||  || — || December 15, 2006 || Kitt Peak || Spacewatch || — || align=right | 2.4 km || 
|-id=935 bgcolor=#E9E9E9
| 364935 ||  || — || March 1, 2008 || Kitt Peak || Spacewatch || HNA || align=right | 2.3 km || 
|-id=936 bgcolor=#E9E9E9
| 364936 ||  || — || March 29, 2008 || Mount Lemmon || Mount Lemmon Survey || AGN || align=right | 1.1 km || 
|-id=937 bgcolor=#d6d6d6
| 364937 ||  || — || March 31, 2008 || Mount Lemmon || Mount Lemmon Survey || KAR || align=right | 1.1 km || 
|-id=938 bgcolor=#E9E9E9
| 364938 ||  || — || March 31, 2008 || Mount Lemmon || Mount Lemmon Survey || PAD || align=right | 1.4 km || 
|-id=939 bgcolor=#E9E9E9
| 364939 ||  || — || March 12, 2008 || Kitt Peak || Spacewatch || AGN || align=right | 1.1 km || 
|-id=940 bgcolor=#d6d6d6
| 364940 ||  || — || March 31, 2008 || Kitt Peak || Spacewatch || — || align=right | 3.8 km || 
|-id=941 bgcolor=#E9E9E9
| 364941 ||  || — || March 31, 2008 || Mount Lemmon || Mount Lemmon Survey || NEM || align=right | 2.2 km || 
|-id=942 bgcolor=#E9E9E9
| 364942 ||  || — || March 11, 2008 || Mount Lemmon || Mount Lemmon Survey || — || align=right | 2.2 km || 
|-id=943 bgcolor=#E9E9E9
| 364943 ||  || — || March 30, 2008 || Kitt Peak || Spacewatch || — || align=right | 3.1 km || 
|-id=944 bgcolor=#E9E9E9
| 364944 ||  || — || March 28, 2008 || Kitt Peak || Spacewatch || AGN || align=right | 1.2 km || 
|-id=945 bgcolor=#E9E9E9
| 364945 ||  || — || April 1, 2008 || Kitt Peak || Spacewatch || — || align=right | 3.2 km || 
|-id=946 bgcolor=#E9E9E9
| 364946 ||  || — || April 4, 2008 || Kitt Peak || Spacewatch || — || align=right | 2.6 km || 
|-id=947 bgcolor=#E9E9E9
| 364947 ||  || — || April 4, 2008 || Mount Lemmon || Mount Lemmon Survey || AGN || align=right | 1.2 km || 
|-id=948 bgcolor=#E9E9E9
| 364948 ||  || — || February 26, 2003 || Campo Imperatore || CINEOS || HOF || align=right | 3.7 km || 
|-id=949 bgcolor=#E9E9E9
| 364949 ||  || — || April 3, 2008 || Mount Lemmon || Mount Lemmon Survey || — || align=right | 2.4 km || 
|-id=950 bgcolor=#E9E9E9
| 364950 ||  || — || April 3, 2008 || Mount Lemmon || Mount Lemmon Survey || — || align=right | 1.7 km || 
|-id=951 bgcolor=#d6d6d6
| 364951 ||  || — || April 5, 2008 || Kitt Peak || Spacewatch || — || align=right | 2.3 km || 
|-id=952 bgcolor=#d6d6d6
| 364952 ||  || — || April 6, 2008 || Mount Lemmon || Mount Lemmon Survey || — || align=right | 3.0 km || 
|-id=953 bgcolor=#E9E9E9
| 364953 ||  || — || April 7, 2008 || Kitt Peak || Spacewatch || — || align=right | 1.4 km || 
|-id=954 bgcolor=#d6d6d6
| 364954 ||  || — || March 31, 2008 || Mount Lemmon || Mount Lemmon Survey || CHA || align=right | 2.0 km || 
|-id=955 bgcolor=#d6d6d6
| 364955 ||  || — || April 7, 2008 || Kitt Peak || Spacewatch || ALA || align=right | 3.3 km || 
|-id=956 bgcolor=#d6d6d6
| 364956 ||  || — || March 28, 2008 || Kitt Peak || Spacewatch || — || align=right | 3.1 km || 
|-id=957 bgcolor=#E9E9E9
| 364957 ||  || — || March 31, 2008 || Mount Lemmon || Mount Lemmon Survey || — || align=right | 2.3 km || 
|-id=958 bgcolor=#E9E9E9
| 364958 ||  || — || April 6, 2008 || Kitt Peak || Spacewatch || — || align=right | 2.0 km || 
|-id=959 bgcolor=#E9E9E9
| 364959 ||  || — || April 7, 2008 || Kitt Peak || Spacewatch || — || align=right | 2.7 km || 
|-id=960 bgcolor=#E9E9E9
| 364960 ||  || — || October 3, 2005 || Catalina || CSS || — || align=right | 2.9 km || 
|-id=961 bgcolor=#E9E9E9
| 364961 ||  || — || February 9, 2008 || Mount Lemmon || Mount Lemmon Survey || — || align=right | 2.4 km || 
|-id=962 bgcolor=#E9E9E9
| 364962 ||  || — || April 13, 2008 || Kitt Peak || Spacewatch || HOF || align=right | 2.6 km || 
|-id=963 bgcolor=#E9E9E9
| 364963 ||  || — || April 14, 2008 || Mount Lemmon || Mount Lemmon Survey || CLO || align=right | 2.7 km || 
|-id=964 bgcolor=#d6d6d6
| 364964 ||  || — || April 13, 2008 || Mount Lemmon || Mount Lemmon Survey || — || align=right | 3.1 km || 
|-id=965 bgcolor=#E9E9E9
| 364965 ||  || — || April 3, 2008 || Mount Lemmon || Mount Lemmon Survey || MRX || align=right | 1.0 km || 
|-id=966 bgcolor=#d6d6d6
| 364966 ||  || — || April 15, 2008 || Kitt Peak || Spacewatch || — || align=right | 3.1 km || 
|-id=967 bgcolor=#d6d6d6
| 364967 ||  || — || April 7, 2008 || Kitt Peak || Spacewatch || — || align=right | 2.3 km || 
|-id=968 bgcolor=#E9E9E9
| 364968 ||  || — || April 7, 2008 || Bergisch Gladbac || W. Bickel || WIT || align=right | 1.1 km || 
|-id=969 bgcolor=#fefefe
| 364969 ||  || — || April 28, 2008 || Mount Lemmon || Mount Lemmon Survey || H || align=right data-sort-value="0.90" | 900 m || 
|-id=970 bgcolor=#E9E9E9
| 364970 ||  || — || September 14, 2005 || Kitt Peak || Spacewatch || WIT || align=right | 1.1 km || 
|-id=971 bgcolor=#E9E9E9
| 364971 ||  || — || April 4, 2008 || Catalina || CSS || — || align=right | 2.2 km || 
|-id=972 bgcolor=#d6d6d6
| 364972 ||  || — || April 26, 2008 || Kitt Peak || Spacewatch || — || align=right | 3.5 km || 
|-id=973 bgcolor=#d6d6d6
| 364973 ||  || — || April 5, 2008 || Kitt Peak || Spacewatch || — || align=right | 2.1 km || 
|-id=974 bgcolor=#E9E9E9
| 364974 ||  || — || April 26, 2008 || Kitt Peak || Spacewatch || CLO || align=right | 2.6 km || 
|-id=975 bgcolor=#d6d6d6
| 364975 ||  || — || April 27, 2008 || Kitt Peak || Spacewatch || FIR || align=right | 4.1 km || 
|-id=976 bgcolor=#d6d6d6
| 364976 ||  || — || April 27, 2008 || Kitt Peak || Spacewatch || EOS || align=right | 2.1 km || 
|-id=977 bgcolor=#d6d6d6
| 364977 ||  || — || April 30, 2008 || Mount Lemmon || Mount Lemmon Survey || — || align=right | 4.3 km || 
|-id=978 bgcolor=#d6d6d6
| 364978 ||  || — || March 12, 2008 || Kitt Peak || Spacewatch || KOR || align=right | 1.3 km || 
|-id=979 bgcolor=#d6d6d6
| 364979 ||  || — || April 16, 2008 || Mount Lemmon || Mount Lemmon Survey || — || align=right | 3.7 km || 
|-id=980 bgcolor=#d6d6d6
| 364980 ||  || — || April 29, 2008 || Kitt Peak || Spacewatch || — || align=right | 2.9 km || 
|-id=981 bgcolor=#d6d6d6
| 364981 ||  || — || April 30, 2008 || Mount Lemmon || Mount Lemmon Survey || CHA || align=right | 2.2 km || 
|-id=982 bgcolor=#E9E9E9
| 364982 ||  || — || April 30, 2008 || Kitt Peak || Spacewatch || BRU || align=right | 4.8 km || 
|-id=983 bgcolor=#E9E9E9
| 364983 ||  || — || April 29, 2008 || Socorro || LINEAR || — || align=right | 1.8 km || 
|-id=984 bgcolor=#d6d6d6
| 364984 ||  || — || April 30, 2008 || Mount Lemmon || Mount Lemmon Survey || BRA || align=right | 1.8 km || 
|-id=985 bgcolor=#d6d6d6
| 364985 ||  || — || April 30, 2008 || Mount Lemmon || Mount Lemmon Survey || — || align=right | 2.2 km || 
|-id=986 bgcolor=#FA8072
| 364986 ||  || — || May 3, 2008 || Kitt Peak || Spacewatch || H || align=right data-sort-value="0.77" | 770 m || 
|-id=987 bgcolor=#d6d6d6
| 364987 ||  || — || May 1, 2008 || Catalina || CSS || MEL || align=right | 4.6 km || 
|-id=988 bgcolor=#d6d6d6
| 364988 ||  || — || May 3, 2008 || Kitt Peak || Spacewatch || EOS || align=right | 2.2 km || 
|-id=989 bgcolor=#d6d6d6
| 364989 ||  || — || May 3, 2008 || Kitt Peak || Spacewatch || — || align=right | 2.8 km || 
|-id=990 bgcolor=#d6d6d6
| 364990 ||  || — || May 4, 2008 || Kitt Peak || Spacewatch || — || align=right | 2.9 km || 
|-id=991 bgcolor=#d6d6d6
| 364991 ||  || — || April 10, 2008 || Kitt Peak || Spacewatch || — || align=right | 3.8 km || 
|-id=992 bgcolor=#d6d6d6
| 364992 ||  || — || May 6, 2008 || Mount Lemmon || Mount Lemmon Survey || — || align=right | 3.2 km || 
|-id=993 bgcolor=#d6d6d6
| 364993 ||  || — || May 16, 2008 || Kitt Peak || Spacewatch || EUP || align=right | 6.8 km || 
|-id=994 bgcolor=#E9E9E9
| 364994 ||  || — || May 26, 2008 || Kitt Peak || Spacewatch || — || align=right | 3.4 km || 
|-id=995 bgcolor=#d6d6d6
| 364995 ||  || — || December 25, 2005 || Kitt Peak || Spacewatch || EOS || align=right | 1.9 km || 
|-id=996 bgcolor=#d6d6d6
| 364996 ||  || — || May 26, 2008 || Kitt Peak || Spacewatch || — || align=right | 3.0 km || 
|-id=997 bgcolor=#d6d6d6
| 364997 ||  || — || May 28, 2008 || Mount Lemmon || Mount Lemmon Survey || — || align=right | 3.9 km || 
|-id=998 bgcolor=#d6d6d6
| 364998 ||  || — || April 1, 2008 || Kitt Peak || Spacewatch || — || align=right | 3.2 km || 
|-id=999 bgcolor=#d6d6d6
| 364999 ||  || — || May 3, 2003 || Kitt Peak || Spacewatch || ITH || align=right | 1.1 km || 
|-id=000 bgcolor=#d6d6d6
| 365000 ||  || — || May 27, 2008 || Kitt Peak || Spacewatch || — || align=right | 2.9 km || 
|}

References

External links 
 Discovery Circumstances: Numbered Minor Planets (360001)–(365000) (IAU Minor Planet Center)

0364